= L-2-hydroxyglutarate dehydrogenase =

Class of enzymes

Identifiers
- EC no.: 1.1.99.2
- CAS no.: 9028-80-2

Databases
- IntEnz: IntEnz view
- BRENDA: BRENDA entry
- ExPASy: NiceZyme view
- KEGG: KEGG entry
- MetaCyc: metabolic pathway
- PRIAM: profile
- PDB structures: RCSB PDB PDBe PDBsum
- Gene Ontology: AmiGO / QuickGO
Search
- PMC: articles
- PubMed: articles
- NCBI: proteins

In enzymology, L-2-hydroxyglutarate dehydrogenase (EC 1.1.99.2) is an enzyme that catalyzes the chemical reaction

(S)-2-Hydroxyglutaric acid
+ electron acceptor
α-Ketoglutaric acid
+ reduced acceptor

The two substrates of this enzyme are (S)-2-hydroxyglutaric acid and an electron acceptor. Its products are α-ketoglutaric acid and the corresponding reduced acceptor. Enzymes which preferentially catalyze the conversion of the (R) stereoisomer of 2-oxoglutarate also exist in both mammals and plants and are named D-2-hydroxyglutarate dehydrogenase. L-2-hydroxyglutarate is produced by promiscuous action of malate dehydrogenase on 2-oxoglutarate; L-2-hydroxyglutarate dehydrogenase is an example of a metabolite repair enzyme that oxidizes L-2-hydroxyglutarate back to 2-oxoglutarate.

== Nomenclature ==
This enzyme belongs to the family of oxidoreductases, specifically those acting on the CH-OH group of donor with other acceptors. The systematic name of this enzyme class is (S)-2-hydroxyglutarate:acceptor 2-oxidoreductase. Other names in common use include:

- (S)-2-hydroxyglutarate:(acceptor) 2-oxidoreductase
- alpha-hydroxyglutarate dehydrogenase
- alpha-hydroxyglutarate dehydrogenase (NAD^{+} specific)
- alpha-hydroxyglutarate oxidoreductase
- alpha-ketoglutarate reductase
- hydroxyglutaric dehydrogenase
- L-alpha-hydroxyglutarate dehydrogenase
- L-alpha-hydroxyglutarate:NAD^{+} 2-oxidoreductase

== Clinical significance ==
Deficiency in this enzyme in humans (L2HGDH) or in the model plant Arabidopsis thaliana (At3g56840) leads to accumulation of L-2-hydroxyglutarate. In humans this results in the fatal neurometabolic disorder 2-Hydroxyglutaric aciduria whereas plants seem to be unaffected by elevated cellular concentrations of this compound

== See also ==
- L2HGDH
- D2HGDH
- D-2-hydroxyglutarate dehydrogenase
- 2-hydroxyglutarate synthase
- 2-Hydroxyglutaric aciduria
- Hydroxyacid-oxoacid transhydrogenase
