= D-2-hydroxyglutarate dehydrogenase =

Class of enzymes

Identifiers
- EC no.: 1.1.99.39

Databases
- IntEnz: IntEnz view
- BRENDA: BRENDA entry
- ExPASy: NiceZyme view
- KEGG: KEGG entry
- MetaCyc: metabolic pathway
- PRIAM: profile
- PDB structures: RCSB PDB PDBe PDBsum
Search
- PMC: articles
- PubMed: articles
- NCBI: proteins

In enzymology, D-2-hydroxyglutarate dehydrogenase (EC 1.1.99.39) is an enzyme that catalyzes the chemical reaction

(R)-2-Hydroxyglutaric acid
+ electron
acceptor
α-Ketoglutaric acid
+ reduced
acceptor

The two substrates of this enzyme are (R)-2-hydroxyglutaric acid and an electron acceptor. Its products are α-ketoglutaric acid and the corresponding reduced acceptor.

The enzyme activity has been confirmed in animals as well as in plants.

== Nomenclature ==
This enzyme belongs to the family of oxidoreductases, specifically those acting on the CH-OH group of donor with other acceptors. The systematic name of this enzyme class is (R)-2-hydroxyglutarate:acceptor 2-oxidoreductase. Other names in common use include:

- (R)-2-hydroxyglutarate:(acceptor) 2-oxidoreductase
- alpha-hydroxyglutarate dehydrogenase
- alpha-hydroxyglutarate dehydrogenase (NAD^{+} specific)
- alpha-hydroxyglutarate oxidoreductase
- alpha-ketoglutarate reductase
- hydroxyglutaric dehydrogenase
- D-alpha-hydroxyglutarate dehydrogenase
- D-alpha-hydroxyglutarate:NAD^{+} 2-oxidoreductase

== Clinical significance ==
Deficiency in this enzyme in humans (D2HGDH) or in the model plant Arabidopsis thaliana (At4g36400) leads to massive accumulation of D-2-hydroxyglutarate. In humans this results in the fatal neurometabolic disorder 2-hydroxyglutaric aciduria whereas plants seem to be to a large extent unaffected by high cellular concentrations of this compound.

== See also ==
- L2HGDH
- L-2-hydroxyglutarate dehydrogenase
- 2-hydroxyglutarate synthase
- Hydroxyacid-oxoacid transhydrogenase
