= Mature T-cell lymphoma =

Group of rare lymphomas

Mature T-cell lymphoma, also called peripheral T-cell lymphoma, is a group of rare, aggressive lymphomas that develop from mature white blood cells and originate from lymphoid tissues outside of the bone marrow. Mature T-cell lymphoma is under the category of non-Hodgkin lymphoma. Mature T-cell lymphomas account for 10% to 15% of all lymphomas and is more common in Asia than in Europe and America. Its common subtypes include angioimmunoblastic T-cell lymphoma, anaplastic large cell lymphoma and peripheral T-cell lymphoma not otherwise specified. While different subtypes have variable symptoms, common symptoms include enlarged painless lymph nodes, fever, weight loss, rash and night sweats.

Some subtypes of mature T-cell lymphoma may be associated with viral exposure as well as gene mutations. Diagnosis is done by physical examinations, assisted by tests like biopsy, PET scan and CT scan to examine the site of lymph node development. Chemotherapy, drugs, autologous stem cell treatment and extracorporeal photopheresis are treatment options. The choice of treatment and its subsequent effectiveness are determined by the subtype present in the patient.

== Subtypes of mature T-cell lymphoma ==
There are many different subtypes under mature T-cell lymphoma, each being considered as a separate disease due to specific clinical features. Incidence of each subtype is subjected to geographical variations. The World Health Organisation (WHO) had identified the naming and features of the subtypes in the "WHO Classification Tumours of Haematopoietic and Lymphoid Tissues", published in 2008. A revision was made in 2016 to update information obtained from advanced researches. The common subtypes are angioimmunoblastic T-cell lymphoma, anaplastic large cell lymphoma and peripheral T-cell lymphoma not otherwise specified.

=== Angioimmunoblastic T-cell lymphoma ===
Angioimmunoblastic T-cell lymphoma (AITL) is a fast-growing form of mature T-cell lymphoma, accounting for 18.5% of patients. It is characterised by systemic disorders, polymorphous lymphoid infiltrate and a significant increase in proliferation of follicular dendritic cells and high endothelial venules. It originates from follicular T helper (T_{FH}) cells, which is important in maintaining immune response. Autoimmune disorders like lymphopenia and hypergammaglobulinemia can be observed in about 50% patients with AITL.

=== Anaplastic large cell lymphoma ===
Anaplastic large cell lymphoma (ALCL) is a subtype of mature T-cell lymphoma involving T-cells or natural killer (NK) cells, representing 12% of patients. It can be recognized by a constant expression of the tumour receptor necrosis factor CD30, a membrane protein expressed by activated T and B cells, in the cancer cells. It is further divided into two subtypes, ALK positive (ALK+) and ALK negative (ALK-), based on whether they express anaplastic lymphoma kinase or not. ALK+ ALCL is more common in children and young adults while ALK- ALCL affects older individuals more.

=== Peripheral T-cell lymphoma not otherwise specified ===
Peripheral T-cell lymphoma not otherwise specified (PTCL-NOS) is a group of biologically and clinically heterogeneous lymphomas that do not fit into the other subtypes of mature T-cell lymphoma. It is the most common subtype, representing 25.9% of mature T-cell lymphoma patients. Due to it being broad and highly heterogeneous, diagnosis of exclusion is carried out by the identification of features that are inconsistent with other subtypes defined by the World Health Organisation. PTCL-NOS mainly affects individuals of older age.

=== Less common subtypes ===
Less common subtypes of mature T-cell lymphoma include cutaneous T-cell lymphoma, adult T-cell leukaemia/lymphoma, enteropathy-type T-cell lymphoma, nasal NK/T-cell lymphoma, hepatosplenic gamma-delta T-cell lymphoma, etc.

== Signs and symptoms ==
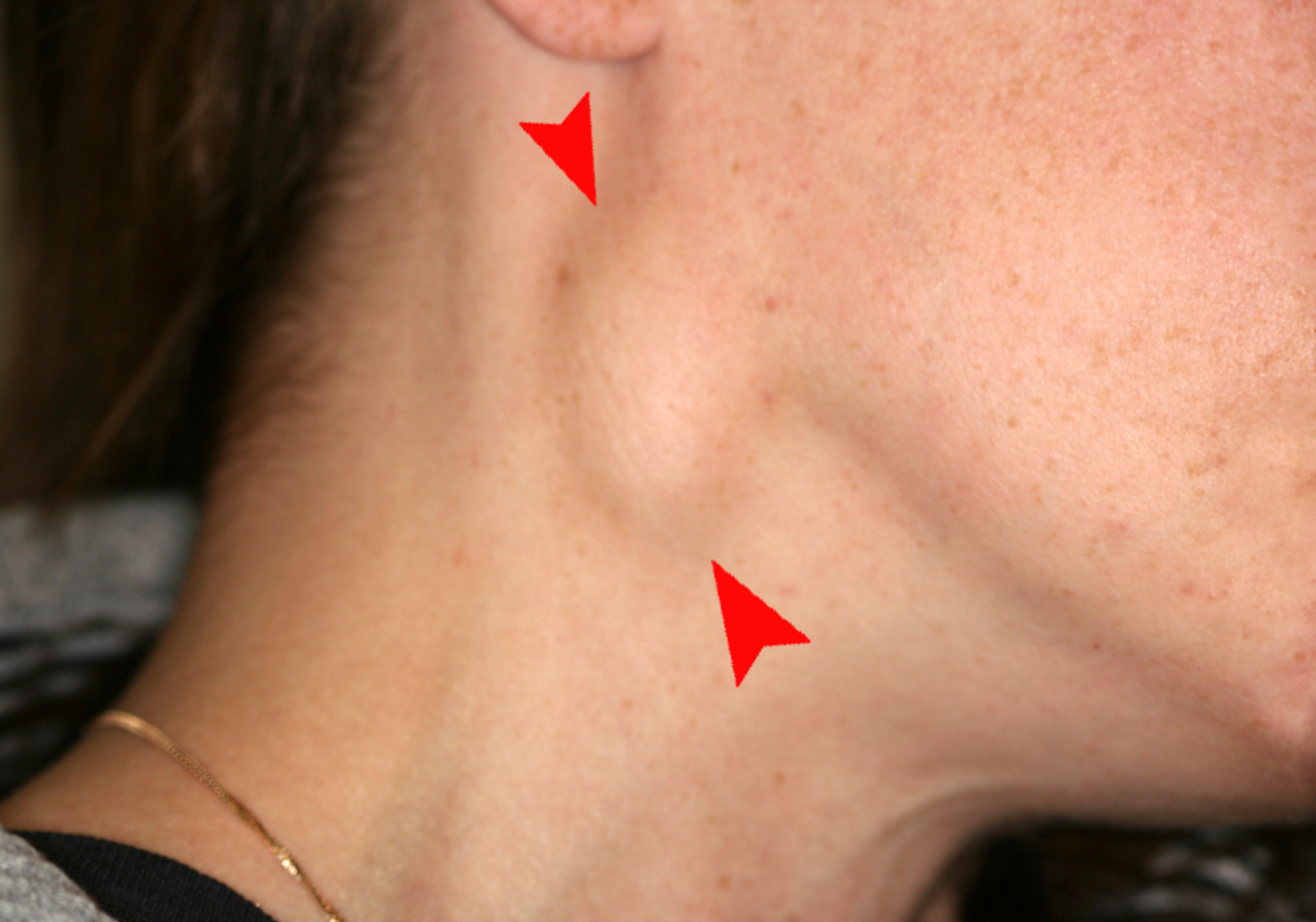
Swelling of lymph node in the neck

Signs and symptoms of mature T-cell lymphoma vary among different subtypes, sometimes even among individuals under the same subtype. Symptoms are divided into two groups, nodal and extranodal symptoms. Nodal symptoms are common, shown by the swelling of lymph nodes in the neck, armpit and/or groin, as cancerous T cells accumulate in lymph nodes. Extranodal symptoms are symptoms shown by organs or tissues outside of the lymphatic system. Examples of such signs and symptoms include splenomegaly, abdominal pain and skin rash. Other common symptoms are fever, night sweat and unexplained weight loss. These symptoms are collectively called B symptoms. Mature T-cell lymphoma is fast-growing and patients are usually diagnosed at later stage. A majority of patients show advanced (stage III and IV) diseases and high International Prognostic Index (IPI) scores. Symptoms specific to subtypes include diffuse lymphadenopathy and hepatosplenomegaly in AITL, and swellings in skin in cutaneous T-cell lymphoma.

== Causes ==
Mature T-cell lymphoma can be associated with viral exposure and gene mutations.

=== Viral Exposure ===
Mature T-cell lymphoma can be associated with exposure to Epstein–Barr virus (EBV) or human T-cell leukaemia virus 1 (HTLV-1). About 30% of PTCL-NOS patients exhibit EBV-infected cancerous T cells, leading to the classification of Epstein–Barr virus-associated peripheral T cell lymphoma not otherwise specified. However, the relationship between EBV and the progression of PTCL-NOS is still under research. About 5% of HTLV-1 carriers would develop the uncommon adult T-cell leukaemia/lymphoma after a long latent period upon infection. HTLV-1 encodes viral proteins to facilitate the proliferation of HTLV-1 infected cells. In the latent period, accumulation of abnormal cells is allowed, leading to adult T-cell leukaemia/lymphoma.

=== Gene Mutations ===
Recent researches identified recurrent mutations that are possibly linked to certain subtypes of mature T-cell lymphoma. For example, in patients with AITL, mutations in the Ten Eleven-Translocation 2 (TET2) gene and isocitrate dehydrogenase 2 (IDH2) gene were identified. Inactivation of TET2 gene caused by loss-of-function mutations in mice leads to abnormal haematopoiesis, as well as abnormalities in lymphoid and myeloid lineages. IDH2 mutations alter the function of IDH enzyme, leading to the production of a rare metabolite D-2-hydroxyglutarate, which may drive tumour progression upon accumulation to high level in cells. TET2 and IDH2 mutations can be found in lymphoid tumour cells from some AITL patients, indicating possible linkage between the mutations and that subtype of lymphoma.

== Diagnosis ==
Doctors may perform physical examinations at the suspected site of lymph node development. The following tests are performed to confirm the presence of lymphoma cells and the severity of disease. Mature T-cell lymphoma may be difficult to diagnose as at least 10% of the patients are not diagnosed properly in local laboratories.

=== Biopsy ===
Biopsy is a common medical test involving removal of a patient's tissues or cells to determine the presence of disease via presence of abnormal cells in the body. Excisional biopsy is commonly performed to screen for mature T-cell lymphoma through the removal of the whole lymph node. Initial biopsy may be insufficient to conclude any results and doctors should perform medical tests on multiple sites for confirmation.

The patient is given anaesthesia before the extraction of lymph nodes from the body. During the biopsy, blood tests are conducted to check the number of cells and to determine the most suitable treatment for the patient. PET and CT scans can help facilitate the process by pinpointing the location of the lymph node.

After extraction, the tissue is processed and viewed under a microscope to examine the presence of lymphoma cells. Some of the characteristics of lymph nodes include:

- Tumour cells with a clear nuclei and cytoplasm
- Diffused pattern
- Follicular variant
- Neoplastic cells are CD3+

Bone marrow is the site of blood cell production. Bone marrow biopsy is used to show the extent of disease, known as staging in pathology. The process takes about 10–15 minutes, requiring the extraction of bone marrow samples from the hip bone to determine the presence of lymphoma cells in bone marrow.

== Treatment ==
Different types of treatment are available, but the exact type of treatment is dependent on the subtype of mature T-cell lymphoma.

=== Chemotherapy ===
Chemotherapy is widely used as the initial treatment to inhibit rapid growing abnormal cells in the body. Patients are usually treated with combination chemotherapy regimem known as CHOP, and it includes:

- Cyclophosphamide: helps suppress the immune response and have a quick control of the disease
- Hydroxydaunorubicin (Doxorubicin): blocks the enzyme that promotes growth and cell division
- Oncovin (Vincristine): used to inhibit the growth of cancer cells by stopping one cancer cell from splitting into two cells
- Prednisone: suppresses the immune system

Chemotherapy involves the use of strong and powerful chemicals. This leads to certain side effects if it is not properly managed and may vary amongst individuals. Kidney and cardiac functions need to be monitored closely as there are concerns about toxification. High dosage of chemotherapy may damage the bone marrow, in which autologous stem cell therapy is a recommended follow-up treatment.

=== Drugs ===
Other common drugs used to treat mature T-cell lymphoma includes pralatrexate (Fotolyn), brentuximab vedotin (Adcetris) and romidepsin (Istodax).

In 2009, pralatrexate became the first drug approved by the US Food and Drug Administration to treat peripheral T-cell lymphoma (PTCL). It is an antifolate drug, meaning that it interferes with the cell's use of folate. Folate, also known as Vitamin B_{9}, is used during the process of DNA synthesis and cell division. Pralatrexate has been used as a monotherapy and also as part of a larger chemotherapy regimen; however, the side effects from using it in combination with other chemotherapy drugs can be severe enough that the dose has to be decreased, which reduces the efficacy.

Brentuximab vedotin is the first approved frontline treatment by FDA to treat mature T-cell lymphoma in 2018 and is mainly used to treat anaplastic large cell lymphoma. It has a chimeric monoclonal antibody (cAC10) that binds to the membrane protein CD30. This binding delivers monomethyl auristatin E (MMAE), an antimitotic agent that inhibits mitosis, and leads to anti-tumour activity. The vesicle containing drug is then fused with lysosome, which breaks the valine-citrulline linker between the main body of the drug and MMAE and releases MMAE into the tumour environment. The effectiveness of Brentuximab vedotin is high as 97% of patients had some tumour shrinkage while 87% of the patients had more than 50% of shrinkage in tumour size.

Romidepsin is mainly used to treat cutaneous T-cell lymphoma. It has a disulphide bond and undergoes reduction reaction to thiol. Thiol binds to zinc and this complex binds to the binding site of histone deacetylase. As histone deacetylase is zinc-dependent, the activity of a cell is inhibited and leads to apoptosis.

=== Autologous stem cell treatment ===
Physicians may recommend patients to undergo autologous stem cell treatment after initial chemotherapy as most patients with PTCL will relapse. It is also used when the lymphoma does not respond well to the initial treatment (refractory lymphoma). Patient's blood are drawn out from the body prior to chemotherapy treatment and stem cells are filtered out through a process called apheresis. Stem cells are infused back into the patient's bloodstream after chemotherapy treatment and replaces the damaged bone marrow or stem cells that are destroyed by the chemotherapy treatment. Patient's response to the treatment should be monitored closely as it takes 3–6 months for the immune system to recover.

=== Extracorporeal photopheresis ===
Extracorporeal photopheresis (ECPP) is mainly used to treat cutaneous T-cell lymphoma. White blood cells are removed from the patient's blood and are treated using photoactive drugs called 8-methoxypsoralen (8-MOP) under ultraviolet light (UVA). White blood cells are then re-infused back into the patient's body after being treated.
