= IDH3B =

Protein-coding gene in humans

Identifiers
- Aliases: IDH3B, H-IDHB, RP46, isocitrate dehydrogenase 3 (NAD(+)) beta, isocitrate dehydrogenase (NAD(+)) 3 beta, isocitrate dehydrogenase (NAD(+)) 3 non-catalytic subunit beta
- External IDs: OMIM: 604526; MGI: 2158650; GeneCards: IDH3B

Gene location (Human)
Chr.	Chromosome 20 (human)
Band	20p13	Start	2,658,395 bp
Band	20p13	End	2,664,219 bp

Gene location (Mouse)
Chr.	Chromosome 2 (mouse)
Band	2|2 F1	Start	130,121,229 bp
Band	2|2 F1	End	130,126,467 bp
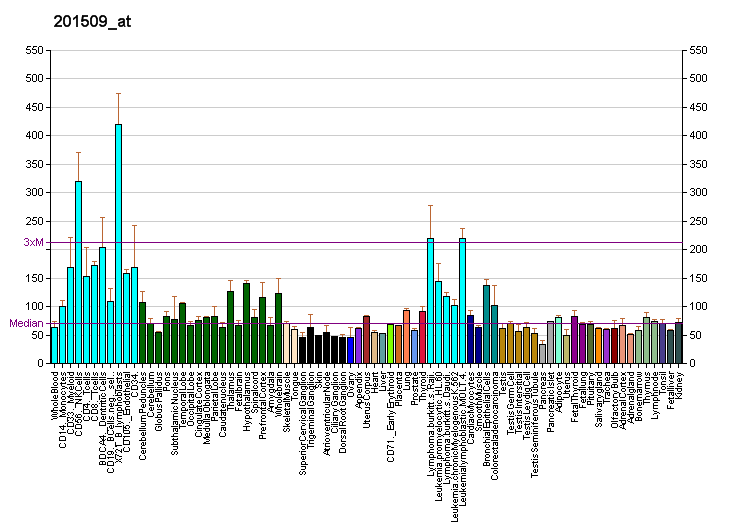

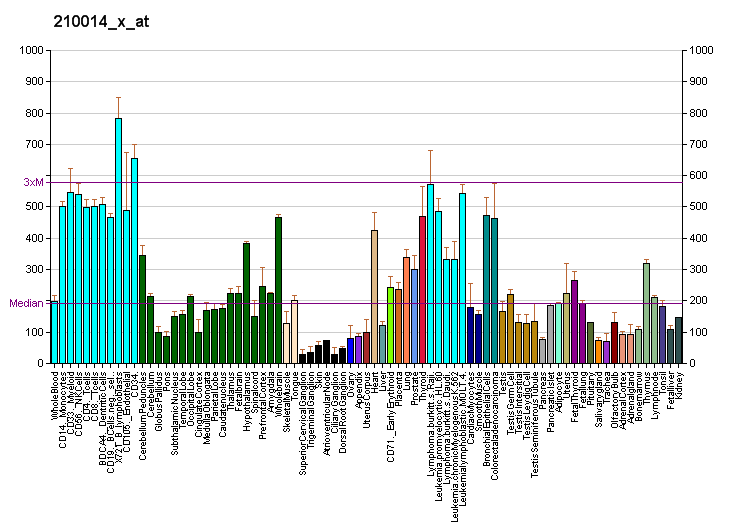

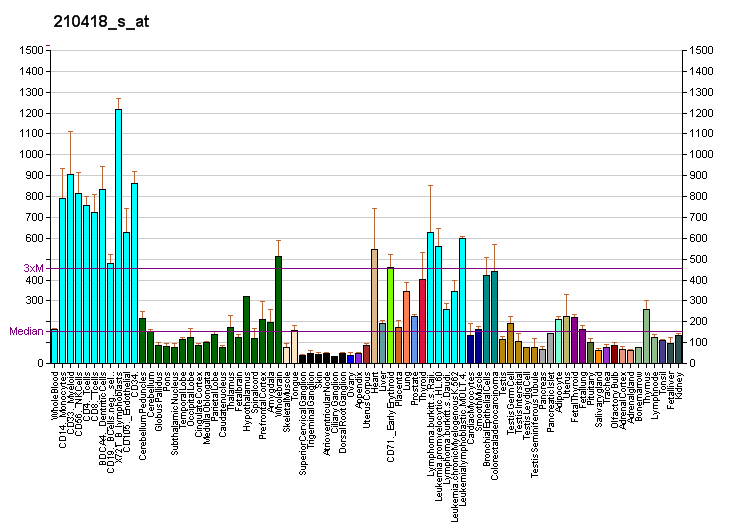
RNA expression pattern
Bgee	Human / Mouse (ortholog); Top expressed in: apex of heart; left ventricle; right hemisphere of cerebellum; mucosa of transverse colon; right auricle of heart; granulocyte; left ovary; myocardium of left ventricle; muscle layer of sigmoid colon; right lobe of thyroid gland / Top expressed in: interventricular septum; masseter muscle; soleus muscle; muscle of thigh; myocardium of ventricle; brown adipose tissue; sternocleidomastoid muscle; intercostal muscle; tunica adventitia of aorta; quadriceps femoris muscle; More reference expression data
BioGPS	More reference expression data
Gene ontology
Molecular function	NAD binding; magnesium ion binding; oxidoreductase activity, acting on the CH-OH group of donors, NAD or NADP as acceptor; electron transfer activity; isocitrate dehydrogenase (NAD+) activity
Cellular component	nucleus; mitochondrial matrix; mitochondrion
Biological process	tricarboxylic acid cycle; isocitrate metabolic process; electron transport chain; 2-oxoglutarate metabolic process; NADH metabolic process
Sources:Amigo / QuickGO
Orthologs
Databases	NCBI: entry; OMA: entry
Species	Human	Mouse
Entrez	3420	170718
Ensembl	ENSG00000101365	ENSMUSG00000027406
UniProt	O43837	n/a
RefSeq (mRNA)	NM_001258384; NM_006899; NM_174855; NM_174856; NM_001330763	NM_130884; NM_001362752
RefSeq (protein)	NP_001245313; NP_001317692; NP_008830; NP_777280	n/a
Location (UCSC)	Chr 20: 2.66 – 2.66 Mb	Chr 2: 130.12 – 130.13 Mb
PubMed search
- Wikidata
View/Edit Human	View/Edit Mouse

Isocitrate dehydrogenase [NAD] subunit beta, mitochondrial is an enzyme that in humans is encoded by the IDH3B gene.

Isocitrate dehydrogenases (IDHs) catalyze the oxidative decarboxylation of isocitrate to 2-oxoglutarate. These enzymes belong to two distinct subclasses, one of which utilizes NAD(+) as the electron acceptor and the other NADP(+). Five isocitrate dehydrogenases have been reported: three NAD(+)-dependent isocitrate dehydrogenases, which localize to the mitochondrial matrix, and two NADP(+)-dependent isocitrate dehydrogenases, one of which is mitochondrial and the other predominantly cytosolic. NAD(+)-dependent isocitrate dehydrogenases catalyze the allosterically regulated rate-limiting step of the tricarboxylic acid cycle. Each isozyme is a heterotetramer that is composed of two alpha subunits, one beta subunit, and one gamma subunit. The protein encoded by this gene is the beta subunit of one isozyme of NAD(+)-dependent isocitrate dehydrogenase. Three alternatively spliced transcript variants encoding different isoforms have been described for this gene. [provided by RefSeq, Jul 2008]

== Structure ==
IDH3 is one of three isocitrate dehydrogenase isozymes, the other two being IDH1 and IDH2, and encoded by one of five isocitrate dehydrogenase genes, which are IDH1, IDH2, IDH3A, IDH3B, and IDH3G. The genes IDH3A, IDH3B, and IDH3G encode subunits of IDH3, which is a heterotetramer composed of two 37-kDa α subunits (IDH3α), one 39-kDa β subunit (IDH3β), and one 39-kDa γ subunit (IDH3γ), each with distinct isoelectric points. Alignment of their amino acid sequences reveals ~40% identity between IDH3α and IDH3β, ~42% identity between IDH3α and IDH3γ, and an even closer identity of 53% between IDH3β and IDH3γ, for an overall 34% identity and 23% similarity across all three subunit types. Notably, Arg88 in IDH3α is essential for IDH3 catalytic activity, whereas the equivalent Arg99 in IDH3β and Arg97 in IDH3γ are largely involved in the enzyme's allosteric regulation by ADP and NAD. Thus, it is possible that these subunits arose from gene duplication of a common ancestral gene, and the original catalytic Arg residue were adapted to allosteric functions in the β- and γ-subunits. Likewise, Asp181 in IDH3α is essential for catalysis, while the equivalent Asp192 in IDH3β and Asp190 in IDH3γ enhance NAD- and Mn^{2+}-binding. Since the oxidative decarboxylation catalyzed by IDH3 requires binding of NAD, Mn^{2+}, and the substrate isocitrate, all three subunits participate in the catalytic reaction. Moreover, studies of the enzyme in pig heart reveal that the αβ and αγ dimers constitute two binding sites for each of its ligands, including isocitrate, Mn^{2+}, and NAD, in one IDH3 tetramer.

=== Isoforms ===
The IDH3B gene contains 12 exons and encodes two alternatively spliced isoforms: IDH3β1 (349 residues) and IDH3β2 (354 residues). These isoforms are tissue-specific and possess optimal pHs matching those of their target tissues. IDH3β1, with an optimal pH of 8.0, is expressed in brain and kidney, whereas IDH3β2, with an optimal pH of 7.6, is expressed in heart and skeletal muscle.

== Function ==
As an isocitrate dehydrogenase, IDH3 catalyzes the reversible oxidative decarboxylation of isocitrate to yield α-ketoglutarate (α-KG) and CO_{2} as part of the TCA cycle in glucose metabolism. This step also allows for the concomitant reduction of NAD+ to NADH, which is then used to generate ATP through the electron transport chain. Notably, IDH3 relies on NAD+ as its electron acceptor, as opposed to NADP+ like IDH1 and IDH2. IDH3 activity is regulated by the energy needs of the cell: when the cell requires energy, IDH3 is activated by ADP; and when energy is no longer required, IDH3 is inhibited by ATP and NADH. This allosteric regulation allows IDH3 to function as a rate-limiting step in the TCA cycle. Within cells, IDH3 and its subunits have been observed to localize to the mitochondria.

== Clinical significance ==
Homozygous loss-of-function mutations of the IDH3B gene has been linked to retinitis pigmentosa, the neurodegeneration of rods and cones in the retina resulting in blindness.

== Interactive pathway map ==
Click on genes, proteins and metabolites below to link to respective articles. (Note: The interactive pathway map can be edited at WikiPathways: "TCACycle_WP78".)

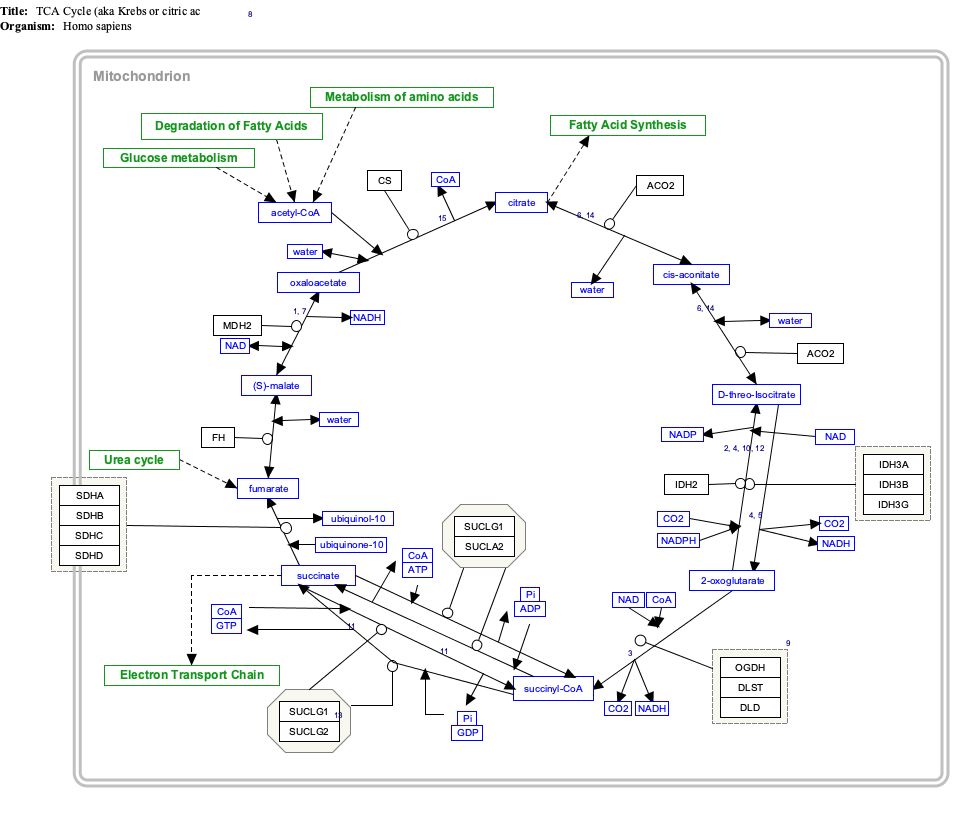

TCACycle_WP78 edit

== See also ==
- IDH1
- IDH2
- IDH3A
- IDH3G
