= IDH3A =

Protein-coding gene in humans

Identifiers
- Aliases: IDH3A, isocitrate dehydrogenase 3 (NAD(+)) alpha, isocitrate dehydrogenase (NAD(+)) 3 alpha, isocitrate dehydrogenase (NAD(+)) 3 catalytic subunit alpha, RP90
- External IDs: OMIM: 601149; MGI: 1915084; GeneCards: IDH3A
Enzyme activity
EC #	BRENDA	ExPASy	KEGG	MetaCyc
1.1.1.41	↗	↗	↗	↗

Gene location (Human)
Chr.	Chromosome 15 (human)
Band	15q25.1	Start	78,131,498 bp
Band	15q25.1	End	78,171,945 bp

Gene location (Mouse)
Chr.	Chromosome 9 (mouse)
Band	9|9 A5.3	Start	54,493,618 bp
Band	9|9 A5.3	End	54,511,945 bp
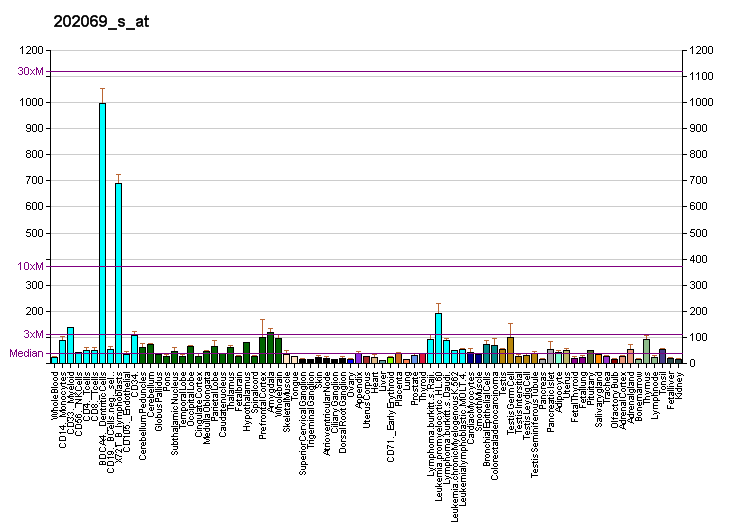

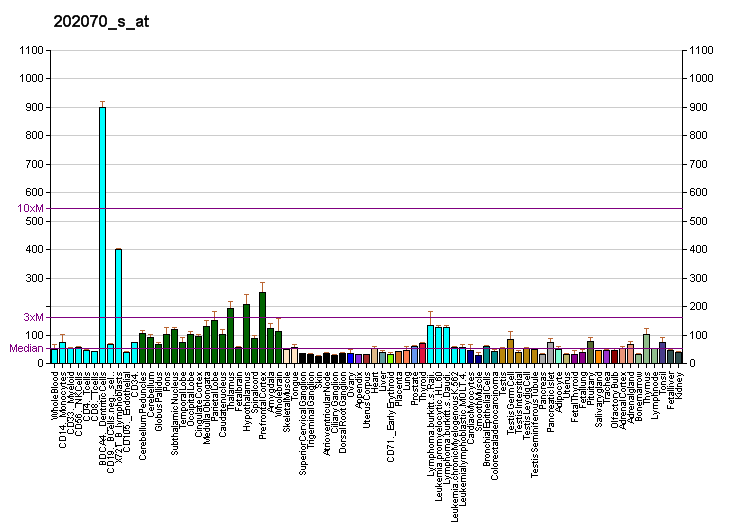
RNA expression pattern
Bgee	Human / Mouse (ortholog); Top expressed in: right auricle of heart; right ventricle; left ventricle; rectum; apex of heart; prefrontal cortex; muscle of thigh; gastrocnemius muscle; biceps brachii; nucleus accumbens / Top expressed in: sternocleidomastoid muscle; triceps brachii muscle; temporal muscle; digastric muscle; vastus lateralis muscle; right ventricle; atrioventricular valve; intercostal muscle; brown adipose tissue; medial head of gastrocnemius muscle; More reference expression data
BioGPS	More reference expression data
Gene ontology
Molecular function	oxidoreductase activity, acting on the CH-OH group of donors, NAD or NADP as acceptor; oxidoreductase activity; NAD binding; metal ion binding; magnesium ion binding; isocitrate dehydrogenase (NAD+) activity
Cellular component	myelin sheath; mitochondrial matrix; mitochondrion; nucleus
Biological process	tricarboxylic acid cycle; carbohydrate metabolic process; isocitrate metabolic process
Sources:Amigo / QuickGO
Orthologs
Databases	NCBI: entry; OMA: entry
Species	Human	Mouse
Entrez	3419	67834
Ensembl	ENSG00000166411	ENSMUSG00000032279
UniProt	P50213	Q9D6R2
RefSeq (mRNA)	NM_005530	NM_029573
RefSeq (protein)	NP_005521	NP_083849
Location (UCSC)	Chr 15: 78.13 – 78.17 Mb	Chr 9: 54.49 – 54.51 Mb
PubMed search
- Wikidata
View/Edit Human	View/Edit Mouse

Isocitrate dehydrogenase [NAD] subunit alpha, mitochondrial (IDH3α) is an enzyme that in humans is encoded by the IDH3A gene. IDH3A is the catalytic (enzyme) subunit of the IDH3 enzyme complex, which converts isocitrate into alpha-ketoglutarate as part of the citric acid cycle.

== IDH3 complex ==
Mitochondrial isocitrate dehydrogenase complex (NAD+)
Overview
- Synonyms: IDH3
- EC Number: EC 1.1.1.41
- Subunits: IDH3A, IDH3B, IDH3G

Biological context
- Location: Mitochondria
- Pathways: Citric acid cycle
- Complex Portal: CPX-5001

Mitochondrial isocitrate dehydrogenase complex (NAD+), or IDH3, is an enzyme and protein complex composed of catalytic protein subunits IDH3A together with regulatory subunits (IDH3B and IDH3G), and metal cations (Mg^{2+} or Mn^{2+}). This is one of the core enzymes of the citric acid cycle, catalyzing the reaction:

D-threo-isocitrate + NAD^{+} → 2-oxoglutarate + CO_{2} + NADH

Structurally, it is composed of 2 IDH3A-IDH3B heterodimers, and 2 IDH3A-IDH3G heterodimers, which together form a heteroctomer. The IDH3A-IDH3G heterodimers are allosterically regulated by citrate and ADP, while the IDH3A-IDH3B heterodimers cannot be allosterically regulated.

== Isocitrate dehydrogenases ==
Isocitrate dehydrogenases (IDHs) catalyze the oxidative decarboxylation of isocitrate to 2-oxoglutarate. These enzymes belong to two distinct subclasses, one of which utilizes NAD(+) as the electron acceptor and the other NADP(+). Five isocitrate dehydrogenases have been reported: three NAD(+)-dependent isocitrate dehydrogenases, which localize to the mitochondrial matrix, and two NADP(+)-dependent isocitrate dehydrogenases, one of which is mitochondrial and the other predominantly cytosolic. NAD(+)-dependent isocitrate dehydrogenases catalyze the allosterically regulated rate-limiting step of the tricarboxylic acid cycle. Each isozyme is a heterotetramer that is composed of two alpha subunits, one beta subunit, and one gamma subunit. The protein encoded by this gene is the alpha subunit of one isozyme of NAD(+)-dependent isocitrate dehydrogenase. [provided by RefSeq, Jul 2008]

== Structure ==
IDH3 is one of three isocitrate dehydrogenase isozymes, the other two being IDH1 and IDH2, and encoded by one of five isocitrate dehydrogenase genes, which are IDH1, IDH2, IDH3A, IDH3B, and IDH3G. The genes IDH3A, IDH3B, and IDH3G encode subunits of IDH3, which is a heterotetramer composed of two 37-kDa α subunits (IDH3α), one 39-kDa β subunit (IDH3β), and one 39-kDa γ subunit (IDH3γ), each with distinct isoelectric points. Alignment of their amino acid sequences reveals ~40% identity between IDH3α and IDH3β, ~42% identity between IDH3α and IDH3γ, and an even closer identity of 53% between IDH3β and IDH3γ, for an overall 34% identity and 23% similarity across all three subunit types. Notably, Arg88 in IDH3α is essential for IDH3 catalytic activity, whereas the equivalent Arg99 in IDH3β and Arg97 in IDH3γ are largely involved in the enzyme’s allosteric regulation by ADP and NAD. Thus, it is possible that these subunits arose from gene duplication of a common ancestral gene, and the original catalytic Arg residue were adapted to allosteric functions in the β- and γ-subunits. Likewise, Asp181 in IDH3α is essential for catalysis, while the equivalent Asp192 in IDH3β and Asp190 in IDH3γ enhance NAD- and Mn^{2+}-binding. Since the oxidative decarboxylation catalyzed by IDH3 requires binding of NAD, Mn^{2+}, and the substrate isocitrate, all three subunits participate in the catalytic reaction. Moreover, studies of the enzyme in pig heart reveal that the αβ and αγ dimers constitute two binding sites for each of its ligands, including isocitrate, Mn2+, and NAD, in one IDH3 tetramer.

== Function ==
As an isocitrate dehydrogenase, IDH3 catalyzes the irreversible oxidative decarboxylation of isocitrate to yield α-ketoglutarate (α-KG) and CO_{2} as part of the TCA cycle in glucose metabolism. This step also allows for the concomitant reduction of NAD+ to NADH, which is then used to generate ATP through the electron transport chain. Notably, IDH3 relies on NAD+ as its electron acceptor, as opposed to NADP+ like IDH1 and IDH2. IDH3 activity is regulated by the energy needs of the cell: when the cell requires energy, IDH3 is activated by ADP; and when energy is no longer required, IDH3 is inhibited by ATP and NADH. This allosteric regulation allows IDH3 to function as a rate-limiting step in the TCA cycle. Within cells, IDH3 and its subunits have been observed to localize to the mitochondria.

== Clinical significance ==
IDH3α expression has been linked to cancer, with high basal expression in multiple cancer cell lines and increased expression indicative of poorer prognosis in cancer patients. IDH3α is proposed to promote tumor growth as a regulator of α-KG, which subsequently regulates HIF-1. HIF-1 is largely known for shifting glucose metabolism from oxidative phosphorylation to aerobic glycolysis in cancer cells (the Warburg effect). Moreover, IDH3α activity leads to angiogenesis and metabolic reprogramming to provide the necessary nutrients for continuous cell growth. Meanwhile, silencing IDH3α is observed to obstruct tumor growth. Thus, IDH3α may prove to be a promising therapeutic target in treating cancer.

IDH3α is also implicated in psychiatric disorders. In particular, IDH3α expression in the cerebellum is observed to be significantly lower for bipolar disorder, major depressive disorder, and schizophrenia. The abnormal IDH3α levels may disrupt mitochondrial function and contribute to the pathogenesis of these disorders.

Mutations in this gene have been associated with autosomal recessive retinitis pigmentosa.

== See also ==
- IDH1
- IDH2
- IDH3B
- IDH3G
