= Metabolite damage =

Metabolite damage can occur through enzyme promiscuity or spontaneous chemical reactions. Many metabolites are chemically reactive and unstable and can react with other cell components or undergo unwanted modifications. Enzymatically or chemically damaged metabolites are always useless and often toxic. To prevent toxicity that can occur from the accumulation of damaged metabolites, organisms have damage-control systems that:

1. Reconvert damaged metabolites to their original, undamaged form (damage repair)
2. Convert a potentially harmful metabolite to a benign one (damage pre-emption)
3. Prevent damage from happening by limiting the build-up of reactive, but non-damaged metabolites that can lead to harmful products (directed overflow)

Damage-control systems can involve one or more specific enzymes.

== Types of damage ==
Similarly to DNA and proteins, metabolites are prone to damage, which can occur chemically or through enzyme promiscuity. Much less is known about metabolite damage than about DNA and protein damage, in part due to the huge variety and number of damage-prone metabolites.

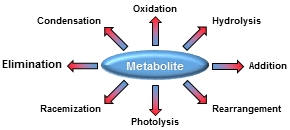
Examples of spontaneous chemical reactions a metabolite can undergo in vivo.

=== Chemical damage ===
Many metabolites are chemically reactive and unstable, and thus prone to chemical damage. In general, any reaction that occurs in vitro under physiological conditions can also occur in vivo. Some metabolites are so reactive that their half-life in a cell is measured in minutes. For example, the glycolytic intermediate 1,3-bisphosphoglyceric acid has a half-life of 27 minutes in vivo. Typical types of chemical damage reactions that can occur to metabolites are racemization, rearrangement, elimination, photodissociation, addition, and condensation.

=== Enzymatic damage ===
Although enzymes are generally specific towards their substrate, enzymatic side activities (enzyme promiscuity) can lead to toxic or useless products. These side reactions proceed at much lower rates than their normal physiological reactions, but build-up of damaged metabolites can still be significant over time. For example, the mitochondrial malate dehydrogenase reduces alpha-ketoglutarate to L-2-hydroxyglutarate 10^{7} times less efficiently than its regular substrate oxaloacetate, but L-2-hydroxyglutarate can still accumulate to several grams per day in a human adult.

== Damage control ==
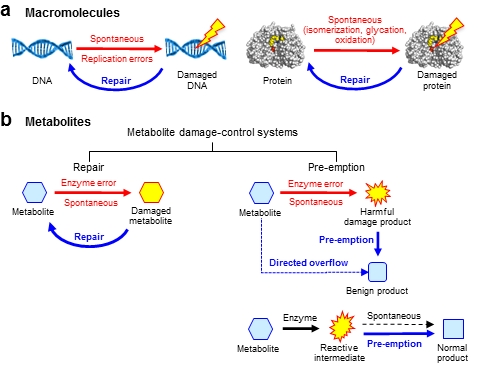
Damage-control systems for metabolites are similar to those for DNA or proteins. Damage reactions are represented by red arrows, whereas damage-control reactions are represented by blue arrows. The solid black arrow at the bottom indicates a normal enzyme reactions, and the dashed black arrow indicates a relatively slow spontaneous reaction. a) Damage by spontaneous reactions or enzymatic mistakes to macromolecules can be repaired by enzymatic control systems. b) The same principle applies to metabolites that are also prone to damage by enzymatic errors or spontaneous chemical reactions. Metabolite repair systems can either repair the damage or pre-empt it; directed overflow is a special case of damage pre-emption.

Metabolite damage-control systems fall into three different categories:

=== Damage repair ===
Damage repair is the conversion of a damaged metabolite back to its original state via one or more enzymatic reactions; the concept is similar to DNA repair and protein repair. For example, the promiscuous activity of malate dehydrogenase causes reduction of alpha-ketoglutarate to L-2-hydroxyglutarate. This compound is a dead-end metabolite and is not a substrate for any other enzyme in central metabolism, and its accumulation in humans causes L-2-Hydroxyglutaric aciduria. The repair enzyme L-2-hydroxyglutarate dehydrogenase oxidizes L-2-hydroxyglutarate back to alpha-ketoglutarate, thus repairing this metabolite. In humans, L-2-hydroxyglutarate dehydrogenase uses FAD as the cofactor, while the E. coli enzyme reduces molecular oxygen.

=== Damage pre-emption ===
Pre-emption prevents damage from happening. This is done either by converting reactive metabolites to less harmful ones, or by speeding up an insufficiently fast chemical reaction. The reactive metabolite can be either a side product, or a normal, but highly reactive intermediate.

For example, a side activity of Rubisco yields small amounts of xylulose-1,5-bisphosphate, which can inhibit Rubisco activity. The CbbY enzyme dephosphorylates xylulose-1,5-bisphosphate to the natural metabolite xylulose-5-phosphate, thereby preventing inhibition of Rubisco.

=== Directed overflow ===
Directed overflow is a special case of damage pre-emption, where excess of a normal, but reactive metabolite could lead to toxic products. Preventing this excess is thus pre-emption of potential damage.

The first two intermediates in riboflavin biosynthesis are highly reactive and can spontaneously break down to 5-phosphoribosylamine and Maillard reaction products, which are highly reactive and harmful. The enzyme COG3236 hydrolyzes these two first intermediates into two less harmful products, thus preventing the harm they would otherwise cause.

== Disease ==
In humans, L-2-Hydroxyglutaric aciduria was the first disease linked to a missing metabolite repair enzyme. Mutations in the L2HGDH gene cause accumulation of L-2-hydroxyglutarate, which is a structural analog to glutamate and alpha-ketoglutarate and presumably inhibits other enzymes or transporters.

== Systems biology ==
Metabolic network modelling aims at reproducing cellular metabolism in silico. Metabolite damage and repair create cellular energy costs, and consequently need to be incorporated into genome-scale metabolic models so that these models can more effectively guide metabolic engineering design.

In addition, genes encoding so-far unrecognized metabolite damage-control systems may constitute a significant fraction of the many conserved genes of unknown function found in the genomes of all organisms.

== Synthetic biology / metabolic engineering ==
When an alien pathway is installed in a host ('chassis') organism, and even when a native pathway is massively upregulated, reactive intermediates may accumulate to levels that negatively impact viability, growth, and flux through the pathway because a matching damage-control system is absent or has been overwhelmed. Engineering damage-control systems may thus be needed to support synthetic biology and metabolic engineering projects.

== See also ==
- Metabolomics
- Systems biology
- Metabolic flux analysis
- Metabolic engineering
- Synthetic biology
