= Tokyo University of Agriculture and Technology =

Japanese national university in Fuchū, Tokyo

Coordinates: 35°41′2.33″N 139°28′43.1″E

- 東京農工大学
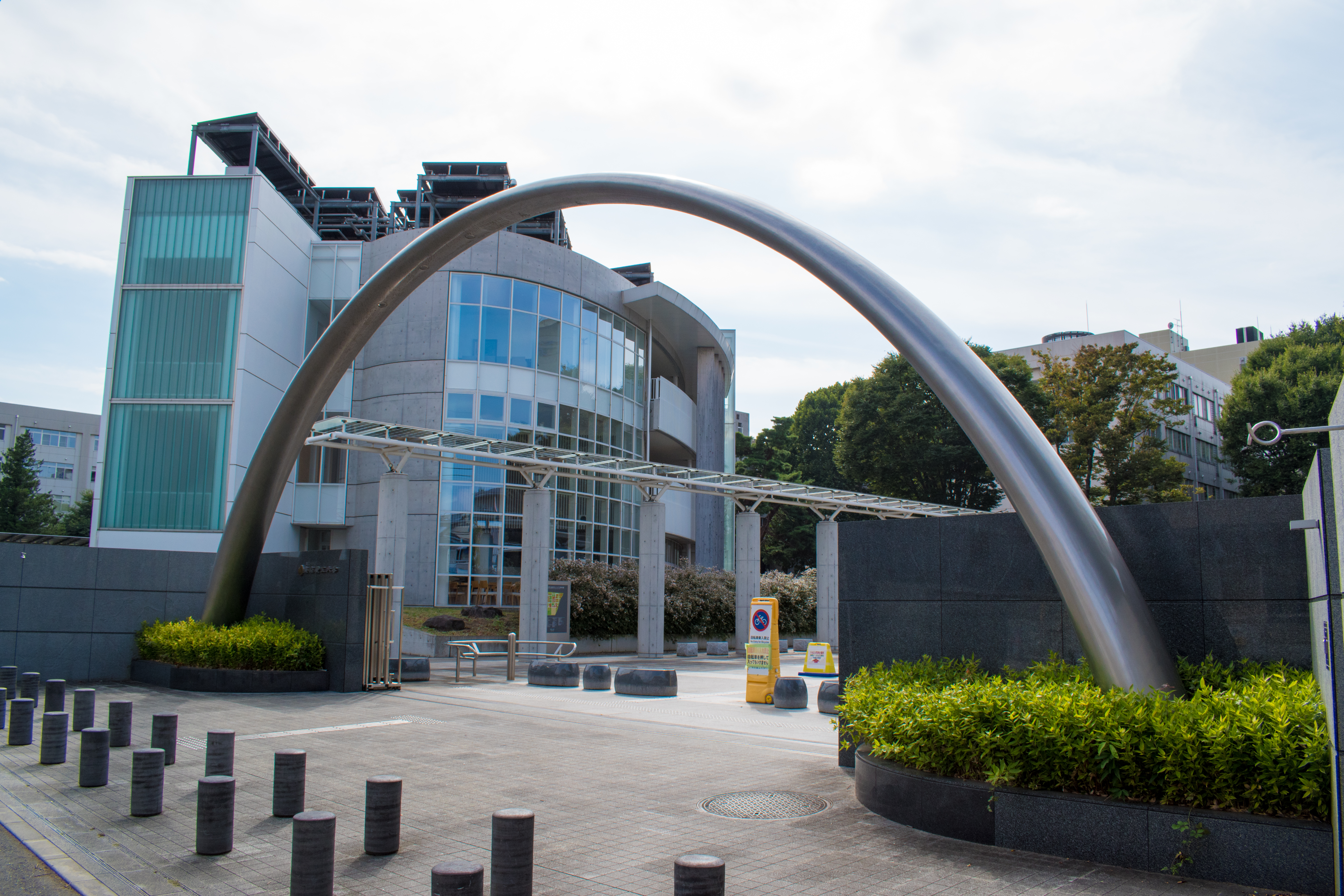
- Koganei Campus East Gate
- Former names: Tokyo Sen'i Senmongakkō (1874–1949); Tokyo Nōrin Semongakkō (1935–1949)
- Type: Public (National)
- Established: 1949
- President: NAKAMURA, Nobuhumi
- Faculty: 394 (May 2019)
- Administrative staff: 209
- Students: 5,705 (May 2020)
- Undergraduates: 3,784
- Postgraduates: 1,921
- Doctoral students: 546
- Location: Fuchū, Tokyo, Japan
- Campus: Urban
- Website: www.tuat.ac.jp

The Tokyo University of Agriculture and Technology (東京農工大学, Tōkyō Nōkō Daigaku) is a national university located in Fuchū, Tokyo, Japan. The university consists of two faculties that provide courses in agriculture and engineering. It is commonly known as TUAT.

== History ==
The predecessor of the university was founded in 1874 as an agricultural training institute. In 1949 it was reorganized into a national university.

== Organization ==
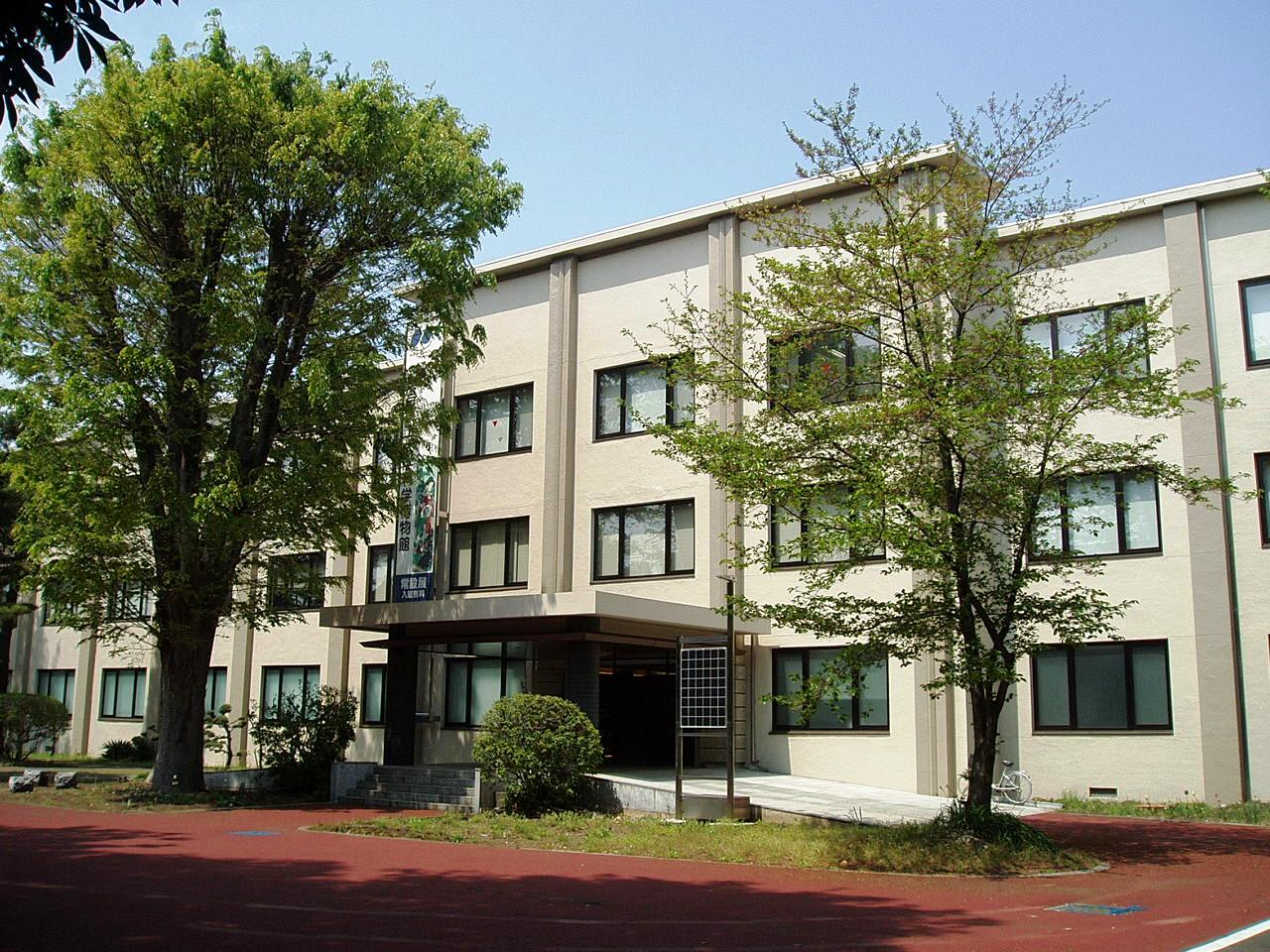
Nature and Science Museum

=== Undergraduate schools ===
- Faculty of Agriculture
  - Department of Biological Production (An)
  - Department of Applied Biological Science (Bn)
  - Department of Environmental and Natural Resource Sciences (En)
  - Department of Ecoregion Science (Rn)
  - Cooperative Department of Veterinary Medicine (Vn) (Note: A joint program with Iwate University.)
- Faculty of Engineering
  - Department of Biotechnology and Life Science
  - Department of Biomedical Engineering
  - Department of Applied Chemistry
  - Department of Applied Physics and Chemical Engineering
  - Department of Mechanical Systems Engineering
  - Department of Electrical Engineering and Computer Science

=== Graduate schools ===
(M=master course, D=three-year doctoral course, D4=four-year doctoral course, M+D=five-year doctoral course, P=professional degree course)

- Graduate School of Agriculture
  - Department of Science of Biological Production ^{(M)}
  - Department of Natural Resources and Eco-materials ^{(M)}
  - Department of Environmental Conservation ^{(M)}
  - Department of International Innovative Agricultural Science ^{(M)}
  - Department of Sustainable and Symbiotic Society ^{(M)}
  - Department of Environmental Science on Biosphere ^{(M)}
  - Department of Environmental and Agricultural Engineering ^{(M)}
  - Cooperative Division of Veterinary Science ^{(D4)}
- Graduate School of Engineering
  - Department of Biotechnology and Life Science ^{(M, D)}
  - Department of Applied Chemistry ^{(M, D)}
  - Department of Mechanical Systems Engineering ^{(M, D)}
  - Department of Applied Physics ^{(M, D)}
  - Department of Applied Physics and Chemical Engineering ^{(M, D)}
  - Department of Electrical and Electronic Engineering ^{(M, D)}
  - Department of Computer and Information Sciences ^{(M, D)}
  - Department of Electronic and Information Engineering ^{(M, D)}
  - Department of Joint Doctoral Program for Sustainability Research (Note: A joint program with the Tokyo University of Foreign Studies and the University of Electro-Communications.) ^{(D)}
  - Department of Industrial Technology and Innovation ^{(P)}
- Graduate School of Bio-Applications and Systems Engineering
  - Department of Bio-Functions and Systems Science ^{(M, D)}
  - Department of Food and Energy Systems Science ^{(M+D)}
  - Cooperative Major of Advanced Health Science ^{(D)} (Note: A joint program with Waseda University.)
- United Graduate School of Agricultural Science (Note: A joint program with Ibaraki University and Utsunomiya University.)
  - Department of Biological Production Science ^{(D)}
  - Department of Applied Life Science ^{(D)}
  - Department of Symbiotic Science of Environment and Natural Resources ^{(D)}
  - Department of Agricultural and Environmental Engineering ^{(D)}
  - Department of Science on Agricultural Economy and Symbiotic Society ^{(D)}
- Leading Graduate School for Green and Clean Food Production ^{(M+D)}
- TUAT WISE Program ^{(M+D)}

=== Research institutions ===
- Institute of Agriculture
- Institute of Engineering
- Institute of Global Innovation Research

=== Facilities ===
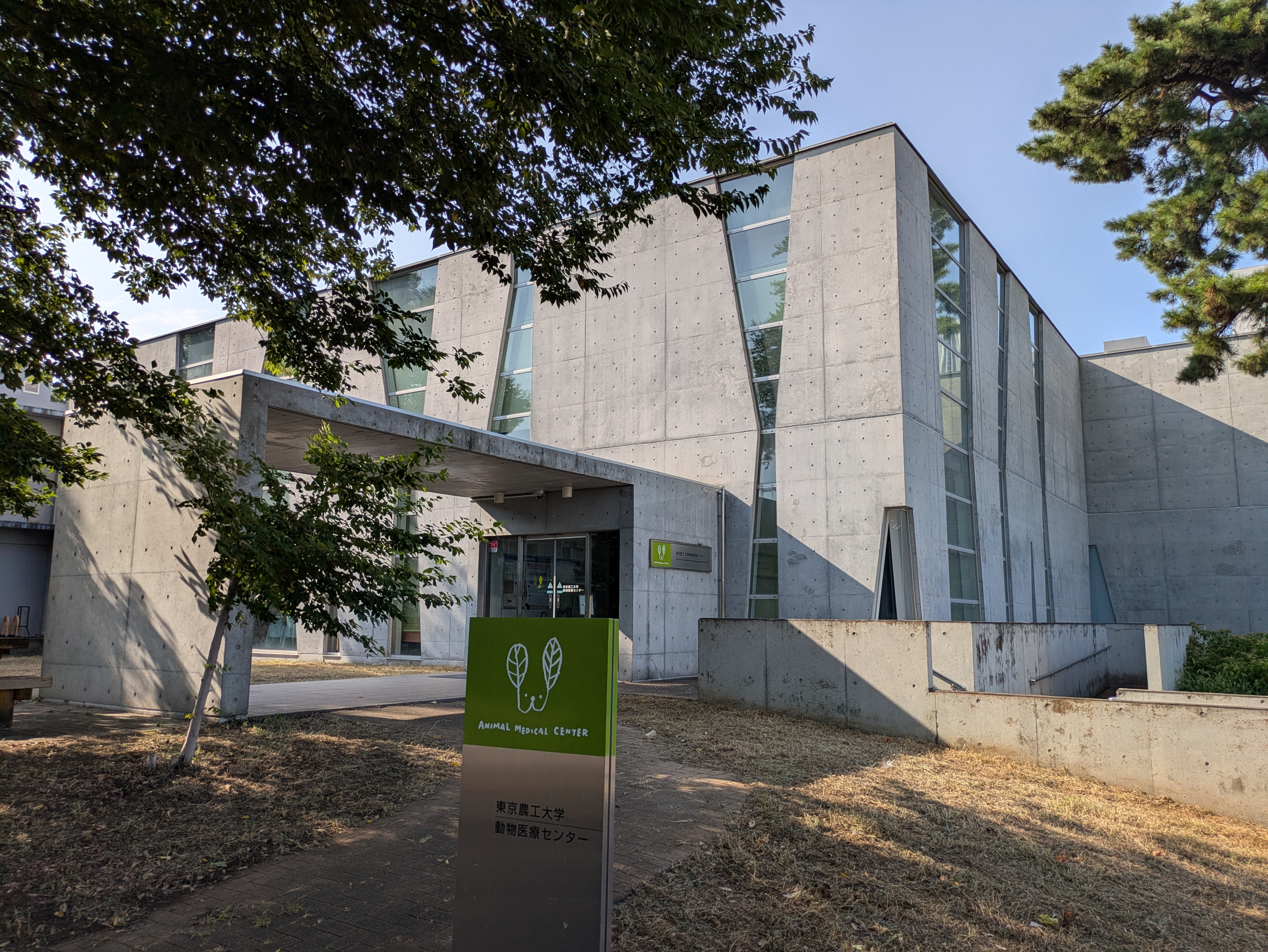
Animal Medical Center

- Nature and Science Museum
- Animal Medical Center

== Campuses ==
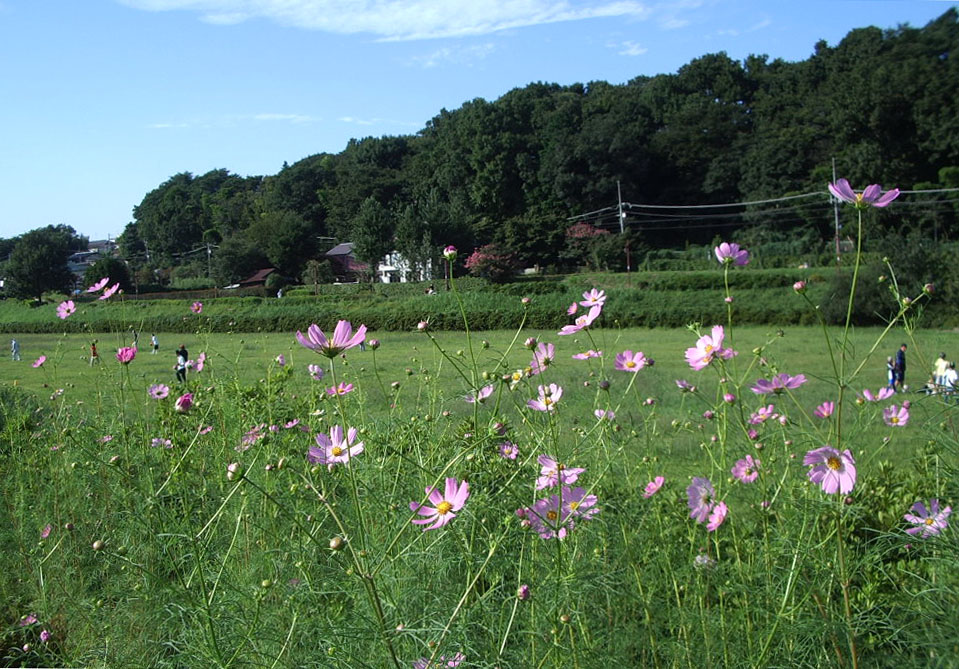
Naka-cho, Koganei City, Tokyo

The university has campuses at two cities in Western Tokyo, Fuchū and Koganei. Fuchu Campus has the university's head office and focuses on agriculture. Koganei Campus focuses on engineering.

=== Fuchu Campus ===
- 3-8-1 Harumi-cho, Fuchu-shi, Tokyo 183-8538, Japan (Head office)
- 3-5-8 Saiwai-cho, Fuchu-shi, Tokyo 183–8509, Japan (Faculty of Agriculture and others)

=== Koganei Campus ===
- 2-24-16 Naka-cho, Koganei-shi, Tokyo 184–8588, Japan (Faculty of Engineering and others)

== Facilities ==
=== Dormitories ===
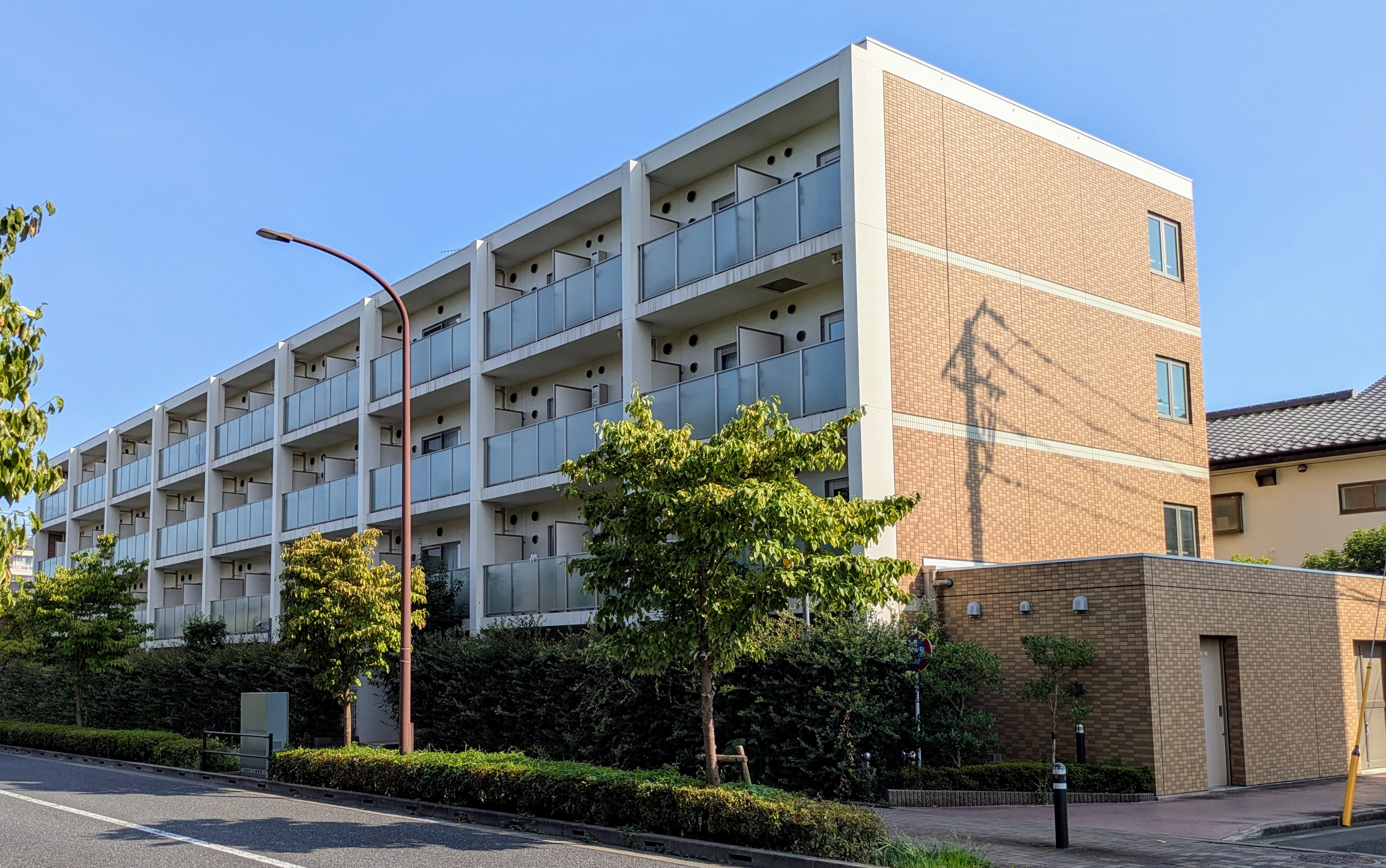
Hinoki-ryō Dormitory

The university has following dormitories in the campuses.

- Fuchu Campus
  - Fuchu International House: For international students, visiting researchers and professors (men and women)
  - Hinoki-ryō (檜寮): For domestic and international students (men and women)
  - Kaede-ryō (楓寮): For domestic and international students (women)
- Koganei Campus
  - Koganei International House: For international students, visiting researchers and professors (men and women)
  - Keyaki-ryō (欅寮): For domestic and international students (men)
  - Sakura-ryō (桜寮): For domestic students (women)

International students can also apply for Hitotsubashi University's International Student House in Kodaira City.

== Alumni ==
- Akira Endo, 2006 Japan Prize laureate, 2008 Lasker-DeBakey Clinical Medical Research Award, the Canada Gairdner International Award 2017. Professor, 1979–1997. Research into the relationship between fungi and cholesterol biosynthesis led to the development of statin drugs, which are some of the best-selling pharmaceuticals in history.
- Susumu Ohno, Author of "Evolution by gene duplication". Ph.D. in Veterinary Science in 1949.
- Hirohide Hamashima, Director of Bridgestone's Motorsport Tyre Development. Master course 1977.
- Taro Kato, President (CEO) of NGK Insulators, Bachelor of Engineering, 1972.
- Shigeru Uehara, Development chief of Honda NSX, Bachelor of Engineering, 1971.
- Masaru Gomi, President/CEO of TOYO Corporation, Bachelor of Engineering.
- Morshed Khan, (1940–) Foreign minister of Bangladesh (2001–2006). Bachelor of Engineering.
- Ginandjar Kartasasmita, (1941–) Former Minister of National Development Planning, Minister of Mines and Energy, Coordinating Minister for Economic Affairs (1998-1999), Member of Indonesian Presidential Advisory Council (2010–2014), 1st Speaker of Indonesia Regional Representative Council (2004–2009); Japan's Grand Cordon of the Order of the Rising Sun 旭日大綬章 2008. Dr. Honoris Causa from TUAT (2005). Bachelor of Engineering 1965.
