= Hirohide Hamashima =

Japanese engineer

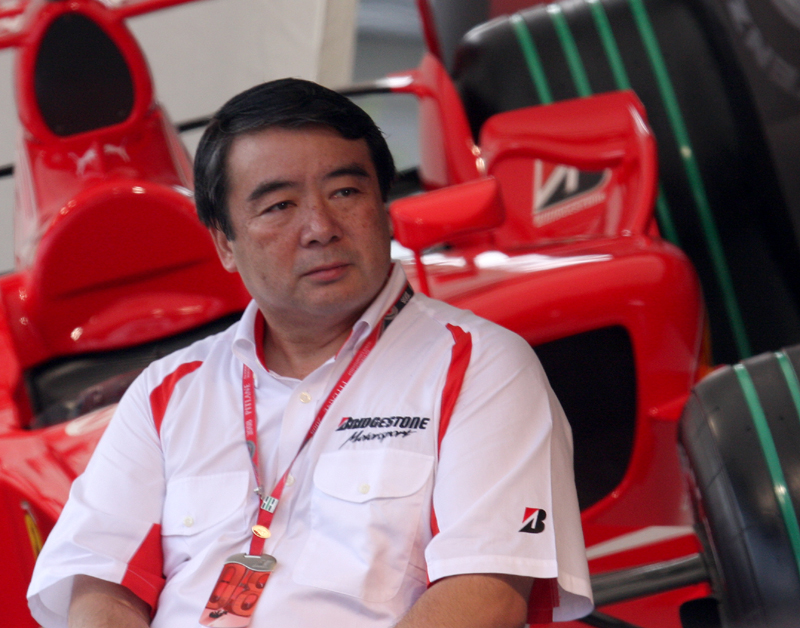
- Hamashima at the 2008 Japanese Grand Prix.
- Born: 1952 (age 73–74); Tokyo, Japan
- Title: Head of the Scuderia Ferrari F1 Team Tyre Development

Hirohide Hamashima (浜島 裕英, Hirohide Hamashima; born 1952 in Tokyo), also known as Hammy, is the former director of the Scuderia Ferrari F1 Team Tyre Development. He previously worked for Bridgestone as the director of its Motorsport Tyre Development until 2011.

== Career ==
=== Bridgestone ===
After graduating from Tokyo University of Agriculture and Technology in a master's course in macromolecular chemistry, Hamashima joined a Japanese tire company, Bridgestone, in 1977.

He has consistently worked on the development of tires for motor sports since 1981. He worked in many racing categories, such as Formula Two, DTM, the Indianapolis 500, Formula One and MotoGP. When the company started to supply tire to Formula One in 1997, Hamashima took leading role to develop racing tire.

During the Formula One era, he often appeared on the Fuji TV's F1 program even in Grands Prix weekends and commented as a tire engineer, about the compatibility of the circuit and the tire, and other related matters. Thus, he became well known among Formula One fans in Japan.

=== Scuderia Ferrari ===
On 11 January 2012, Scuderia Ferrari announced that Hamashima moved to the team and took a role in its technical department to improve the interaction of the Ferrari car and its Pirelli tyres. Hamashima left Ferrari at the end of 2014.

=== Later efforts ===
On 5 March 2015, MediaDo Kageyama Racing (owned by Masahiko Kageyama, who finished in 3rd place at the 1998 24 Hours of Le Mans with Kazuyoshi Hoshino and Aguri Suzuki) announced that Hamashima had become a special advisor to the team.

In January 2016, he joined CERUMO taking part in Super Formula and Super GT, and he became the team principal.
