= L2HGDH =

Protein-coding gene in the species Homo sapiens

Identifiers
- Aliases: L2HGDH, C14orf160, L2HGA, L-2-hydroxyglutarate dehydrogenase
- External IDs: OMIM: 609584; MGI: 2384968; HomoloGene: 11767; GeneCards: L2HGDH; OMA:L2HGDH - orthologs

Gene location (Human)
| Chr. | Chromosome 14 (human) |
| Band | 14q21.3 | Start | 50,237,563 bp |
| Band | 14q21.3 | End | 50,312,229 bp |

Gene location (Mouse)
| Chr. | Chromosome 12 (mouse) |
| Band | 12|12 C2 | Start | 69,737,207 bp |
| Band | 12|12 C2 | End | 69,771,647 bp |
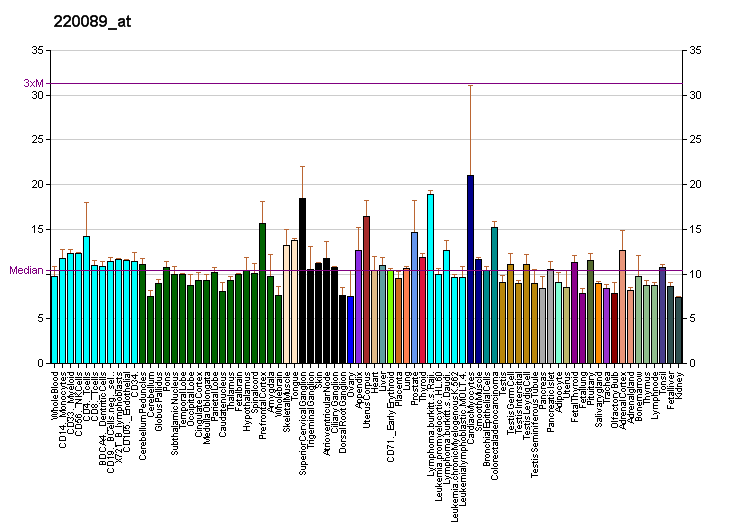
RNA expression pattern
| Bgee | Human / Mouse (ortholog); Top expressed in: gonad; muscle of leg; gastrocnemius muscle; muscle of thigh; testicle; human kidney; islet of Langerhans; ventricular zone; rectum; Skeletal muscle tissue of biceps brachii / Top expressed in: right kidney; proximal tubule; interventricular septum; masseter muscle; otic vesicle; human kidney; spermatocyte; supraoptic nucleus; saccule; morula; More reference expression data |
| BioGPS | More reference expression data |
Gene ontology
| Molecular function | oxidoreductase activity; 2-hydroxyglutarate dehydrogenase activity; (S)-2-hydroxy-acid oxidase activity |
| Cellular component | integral component of membrane; mitochondrial inner membrane; mitochondrion; integral component of mitochondrial inner membrane |
| Biological process | 2-oxoglutarate metabolic process |
Sources:Amigo / QuickGO
Orthologs
| Species | Human | Mouse |
| Entrez | 79944 | 217666 |
| Ensembl | ENSG00000087299 | ENSMUSG00000020988 |
| UniProt | Q9H9P8 | Q91YP0 |
| RefSeq (mRNA) | NM_024884 | NM_145443 |
| RefSeq (protein) | NP_079160 | NP_663418 |
| Location (UCSC) | Chr 14: 50.24 – 50.31 Mb | Chr 12: 69.74 – 69.77 Mb |
| PubMed search |
- Wikidata
| View/Edit Human | View/Edit Mouse |

L-2-hydroxyglutarate dehydrogenase, mitochondrial is an enzyme that in humans is encoded by the L2HGDH gene, also known as C14orf160, on chromosome 14.

== Function ==
This gene encodes L-2-hydroxyglutarate dehydrogenase, a flavin adenine dinucleotide (FAD)-dependent enzyme that oxidizes L-2-hydroxyglutarate to alpha-ketoglutarate in a variety of mammalian tissues. Mutations in this gene cause L-2-hydroxyglutaric aciduria, a rare autosomal recessive neurometabolic disorder resulting in moderate to severe intellectual disability.

L2HGDH codes for a protein that is 50 kDa in size. The L2HGDH protein contains a mitochondrial-targeting transit peptide and is localized to the mitochondrial inner membrane inside mitochondria inside the cell. The L2HGDH protein catalyzes the following reaction, and requires flavin adenine dinucleotide (FAD) as a co-factor:

(S)-2-hydroxyglutarate + acceptor = 2-oxoglutarate + reduced acceptor.

L-2-hydroxyglutarate is produced by promiscuous action of malate dehydrogenase on 2-oxoglutarate; the L2HGDH protein is thus an example of a metabolite repair enzyme because it reconverts the useless damage product L-2-hydroxyglutarate back to 2-oxoglutarate.

== Clinical significance ==
Mutations in the L2HGDH gene cause L-2-hydroxyglutaric aciduria, a rare autosomal recessive neurometabolic disorder. Individuals with L2HGDH mutations present toxic accumulation of high concentration of L-2-hydroxyglutaric acid in the plasma and cerebrospinal fluid. At least 70 disease-causing variants in the L2HGDH gene have been discovered in patients. Patients with L-2-hydroxyglutaric aciduria are associated with moderate to severe mental retardation, psychomotor retardation, cerebellar ataxia, macrocephaly, or epilepsy.

L2HGDH has a role in mediating differentiation in T-cells via its activity on S-2HG.

== Molecular interactions ==
KLK10

== See also ==
- D2HGDH
- 2-hydroxyglutarate synthase
- 2-hydroxyglutarate dehydrogenase
- Hydroxyacid-oxoacid transhydrogenase
