= 2-Hydroxyglutaric aciduria =

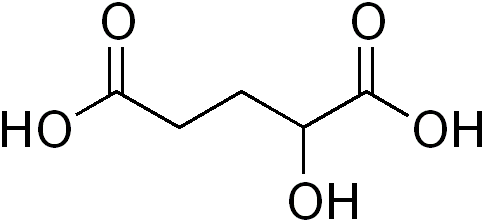
- Alpha-Hydroxyglutaric acid

2-hydroxyglutaric aciduria is a rare neurometabolic disorder characterized by the significantly elevated levels of hydroxyglutaric acid in one's urine. It is either autosomal recessive or autosomal dominant.

== Presentation ==
The signs/symptoms of this condition are consistent with the following:

- Intellectual disability,
- Muscular hypotonia
- Encephalitis
- Seizures
- Aphasia

== Cause ==
Most forms of 2-Hydroxyglutaric aciduria have an autosomal recessive pattern of inheritance.

Mutation in several genes can lead to different types of 2-hydroxyglutaric aciduria. For example, the D2HGDH and L2HGDH genes provide instructions for making enzymes that are found in mitochondria - in which these enzymes break down D-2-hydroxyglutarate and L-2-hydroxyglutarate, respectively, as a part of normal reaction series that generate energy for cell activities. Any mutations occur in either of these genes would interrupt the functional enzymes and allow both 2-hydroxyglutarates to accumulate in cells, which cause 2-hydroxyglutaric aciduria type I. Moreover, it is known that type II for D-2-hydroxyglutaric aciduria and a mixed type for both 2-hydroxyglutarates come from mutations in IDH2 gene and SLC25A1 gene, respectively.

== Diagnosis ==
=== Classification ===
2-hydroxyglutaric aciduria is an organic aciduria, and because of the stereoisomeric property of 2-hydroxyglutarate different variants of this disorder are distinguished:

==== L-2-hydroxyglutaric aciduria ====
The L-2 form is more common, severe, and mainly affects the central nervous system. The basal ganglia are affected, and cystic cavitations in the white matter of the brain are common, beginning in infancy. This form is chronic, with early symptoms such as hypotonia, tremors, and epilepsy declining into spongiform leukoencephalopathy, muscular choreodystonia, mental retardation, and psychomotor regression.

It is associated with L2HGDH, which encodes L-2-hydroxyglutarate dehydrogenase. L-2-hydroxyglutarate is produced by promiscuous action of malate dehydrogenase on 2-oxoglutarate, and L-2-hydroxyglutarate dehydrogenase is an example of a metabolite repair enzyme that oxidizes L-2-hydroxyglutarate back to 2-oxoglutarate.

==== D-2-hydroxyglutaric aciduria ====
The D2 form is rare, with symptoms including macrocephaly, cardiomyopathy, mental retardation, hypotonia, and cortical blindness. It is caused by recessive mutations in D2HGDH (type I) or by dominant gain-of-function mutations in IDH2 (type II).

==== Combined D-2- and L-2-hydroxyglutaric aciduria ====
The combined form is characterized by severe early-onset epileptic encephalopathy and absence of developmental progress. It is caused by recessive mutations in SLC25A1 encoding the mitochondrial citrate carrier.

== Treatment ==
The treatment of 2-Hydroxyglutaric aciduria is based on seizure control, the prognosis depends on how severe the condition is.

== See also ==
- 2-hydroxyglutarate synthase
- 2-hydroxyglutarate dehydrogenase
- Hydroxyacid-oxoacid transhydrogenase
- Alpha-Hydroxyglutaric acid
