= D2HGDH =

Protein-coding gene in the species Homo sapiens

Identifiers
- Aliases: D2HGDH, D2HGD, D-2-hydroxyglutarate dehydrogenase
- External IDs: OMIM: 609186; MGI: 2138209; HomoloGene: 5534; GeneCards: D2HGDH; OMA:D2HGDH - orthologs

Gene location (Human)
Chr.	Chromosome 2 (human)
Band	2q37.3	Start	241,734,602 bp
Band	2q37.3	End	241,768,816 bp

Gene location (Mouse)
Chr.	Chromosome 1 (mouse)
Band	1|1 D	Start	93,752,631 bp
Band	1|1 D	End	93,780,070 bp
RNA expression pattern
Bgee	Human / Mouse (ortholog); Top expressed in: right uterine tube; pancreatic ductal cell; tendon of biceps brachii; left lobe of thyroid gland; right lobe of thyroid gland; anterior pituitary; skin of abdomen; right lobe of liver; left ovary; transverse colon / Top expressed in: left lobe of liver; otolith organ; utricle; interventricular septum; Rostral migratory stream; ascending aorta; hand; semi-lunar valve; Paneth cell; ciliary body; More reference expression data
BioGPS	n/a
Gene ontology
Molecular function	oxidoreductase activity; catalytic activity; flavin adenine dinucleotide binding; oxidoreductase activity, acting on CH-OH group of donors; D-lactate dehydrogenase (cytochrome) activity; (R)-2-hydroxyglutarate dehydrogenase activity; FAD binding
Cellular component	mitochondrial matrix; mitochondrion; extrinsic component of cytoplasmic side of plasma membrane
Biological process	response to calcium ion; response to zinc ion; response to magnesium ion; response to cobalt ion; response to manganese ion; 2-oxoglutarate metabolic process; lactate oxidation; respiratory electron transport chain
Sources:Amigo / QuickGO
Orthologs
Species	Human	Mouse
Entrez	728294	98314
Ensembl	ENSG00000180902	ENSMUSG00000073609
UniProt	Q8N465	Q8CIM3
RefSeq (mRNA)	NM_001287249; NM_152783; NM_001352824	NM_178882; NM_001310767
RefSeq (protein)	NP_001274178; NP_689996; NP_001339753	NP_001297696; NP_849213
Location (UCSC)	Chr 2: 241.73 – 241.77 Mb	Chr 1: 93.75 – 93.78 Mb
PubMed search
- Wikidata
View/Edit Human	View/Edit Mouse

D-2-hydroxyglutarate dehydrogenase, mitochondrial is an enzyme that in humans is encoded by the D2HGDH gene.

This gene encodes D-2hydroxyglutarate dehydrogenase is a mitochondrial enzyme belonging to the FAD-binding oxidoreductase/transferase type 4 family. This enzyme, which is most active in liver and kidney but also active in heart and brain, converts D-2-hydroxyglutarate to 2-ketoglutarate. Mutations in this gene are present in D-2-hydroxyglutaric aciduria, a rare recessive neurometabolic disorder causing developmental delay, epilepsy, hypotonia, and dysmorphic features.

== See also ==
- L2HGDH
- 2-hydroxyglutarate synthase
- 2-hydroxyglutarate dehydrogenase
- Hydroxyacid-oxoacid transhydrogenase
