= Molecular promiscuity =

Ability of a molecule to interact with other classes and subtypes of molecules

Molecular promiscuity indicates the ability of a molecule to bind to or interact with one or more other classes and subtypes of molecules, in synergistic or antagonistic ways. These interactions may involve multiple paracrine, endocrine and autocrine features.
