= Hydroxyacid-oxoacid transhydrogenase =

hydroxyacid-oxoacid transhydrogenase

Identifiers
- EC no.: 1.1.99.24
- CAS no.: 117698-31-4

Databases
- IntEnz: IntEnz view
- BRENDA: BRENDA entry
- ExPASy: NiceZyme view
- KEGG: KEGG entry
- MetaCyc: metabolic pathway
- PRIAM: profile
- PDB structures: RCSB PDB PDBe PDBsum
- Gene Ontology: AmiGO / QuickGO
Search
- PMC: articles
- PubMed: articles
- NCBI: proteins

In enzymology, hydroxyacid-oxoacid transhydrogenase (EC 1.1.99.24) is an enzyme that catalyzes the chemical reaction

(S)-3-hydroxybutyric acid
+
α-ketoglutaric acid
acetoacetic acid
+
(R)-2-hydroxyglutaric acid

The two substrates of this enzyme are (S)-3-hydroxybutyric acid and α-ketoglutaric acid. Its products are acetoacetic acid and (R)-2-hydroxyglutaric acid.

This enzyme belongs to the family of oxidoreductases, specifically those acting on the CH-OH group of donor with other acceptors. The systematic name of this enzyme class is (S)-3-hydroxybutanoate:2-oxoglutarate oxidoreductase. This enzyme is also called transhydrogenase, hydroxy acid-oxo acid.

== See also ==
- D2HGDH
- L2HGDH
- 2-hydroxyglutarate synthase
- 2-hydroxyglutarate dehydrogenase
- 2-Hydroxyglutaric aciduria
