= Α-Hydroxyglutaric acid =

α-Hydroxyglutaric acid
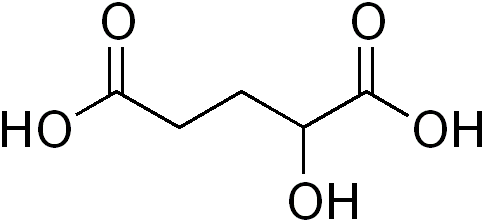

Names
- Preferred IUPAC name 2-Hydroxypentanedioic acid
- Other names 2-Hydroxyglutaric acid

Identifiers
CAS Number	2889-31-8
3D model (JSmol)	Interactive image; Interactive image
Beilstein Reference	1723805
ChEBI	CHEBI:17084
ChemSpider	42
KEGG	C02630
MeSH	Alpha-hydroxyglutarate
PubChem CID	43
UNII	RS4M3UYS95
CompTox Dashboard (EPA)	DTXSID40864360
- InChI: InChI=1S/C5H8O5/c6-3(5(9)10)1-2-4(7)8/h3,6H,1-2H2,(H,7,8)(H,9,10) Key: HWXBTNAVRSUOJR-UHFFFAOYSA-N; InChI=1/C5H8O5/c6-3(5(9)10)1-2-4(7)8/h3,6H,1-2H2,(H,7,8)(H,9,10) Key: HWXBTNAVRSUOJR-UHFFFAOYAI
- SMILES: C(CC(=O)O)C(C(=O)O)O; O=C(O)C(O)CCC(=O)O

Properties
Chemical formula	C_{5}H_{8}O_{5}
Molar mass	148.114 g·mol^{−1}
- Except where otherwise noted, data are given for materials in their standard state (at 25 °C [77 °F], 100 kPa). verify (what is ?) Infobox references

α-Hydroxyglutaric acid (2-hydroxyglutaric acid) is an alpha hydroxy acid form of glutaric acid.

== In biology ==
In humans the compound is formed by a hydroxyacid-oxoacid transhydrogenase whereas in bacteria is formed by a 2-hydroxyglutarate synthase. The compound can be converted to α-ketoglutaric acid through the action of a 2-hydroxyglutarate dehydrogenase which, in humans, are two enzymes called D2HGDH and L2HGDH. Deficiency in either of these two enzymes lead to a disease known as 2-hydroxyglutaric aciduria.

== D-2-hydroxyglutarate ==
Mutations in isocitrate dehydrogenase (IDH1 and IDH2), which frequently occur in glioma and AML, produce D-2-hydroxyglutarate from alpha-ketoglutarate. D-2-hydroxyglutarate accumulates to very high concentrations which inhibits the function of enzymes that are dependent on alpha-ketoglutarate, including histone lysine demethylases. This leads to a hypermethylated state of DNA and histones, which results in different gene expression that can activate oncogenes and inactivate tumor-suppressor genes. Studies have also shown that 2-hydroxyglutarate may be converted back to alpha-ketoglutarate either enzymatically or non-enzymatically. Further studies are required to fully understand the dynamics between 2-hydroxyglutarate and alpha-ketoglutarate.

== L-2-hydroxyglutarate ==
On the other hand, L-2-hydroxyglutarate is produced at high levels in low oxygen conditions, including cells of the immune system.
