= 2-hydroxyglutarate synthase =

Class of enzymes

Identifiers
- EC no.: 2.3.3.11
- CAS no.: 9024-02-6

Databases
- IntEnz: IntEnz view
- BRENDA: BRENDA entry
- ExPASy: NiceZyme view
- KEGG: KEGG entry
- MetaCyc: metabolic pathway
- PRIAM: profile
- PDB structures: RCSB PDB PDBe PDBsum
- Gene Ontology: AmiGO / QuickGO
Search
- PMC: articles
- PubMed: articles
- NCBI: proteins

2-hydroxyglutarate synthase (EC 2.3.3.11) is an enzyme that catalyzes the chemical reaction

Glyoxylic acid
+ Propanoyl-CoA
H_{2}O
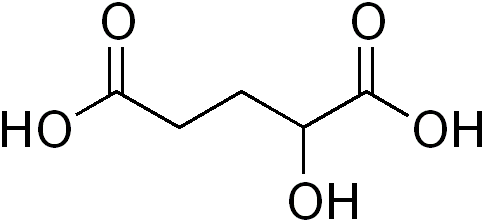
α-Hydroxyglutaric acid
+ Coenzyme A

The three substrates of this enzyme are glyoxylic acid, propanoyl-CoA, and water. Its products are α-hydroxyglutaric acid and coenzyme A.

This enzyme belongs to the family of transferases, specifically those acyltransferases that convert acyl groups into alkyl groups on transfer. The systematic name of this enzyme class is propanoyl-CoA:glyoxylate C-propanoyltransferase (thioester-hydrolysing, 2-carboxyethyl-forming). Other names in common use include 2-hydroxyglutaratic synthetase, 2-hydroxyglutaric synthetase, alpha-hydroxyglutarate synthase, hydroxyglutarate synthase, and 2-hydroxyglutarate glyoxylate-lyase (CoA-propanoylating).

== See also ==
- D2HGDH
- L2HGDH
- 2-hydroxyglutarate dehydrogenase
- 2-Hydroxyglutaric aciduria
- Hydroxyacid-oxoacid transhydrogenase
