= Enzyme promiscuity =

Ability of an enzyme to catalyse multiple metabolic reactions simultaneously

Enzyme promiscuity is the ability of an enzyme to catalyze an unexpected side reaction in addition to its main reaction. Although enzymes are remarkably specific catalysts, they can often perform side reactions in addition to their main, native catalytic activity. These wild activities are usually slow relative to the main activity and are under neutral selection. Despite ordinarily being physiologically irrelevant, under new selective pressures, these activities may confer a fitness benefit therefore prompting the evolution of the formerly promiscuous activity to become the new main activity. An example of this is the atrazine chlorohydrolase (atzA encoded) from Pseudomonas sp. ADP evolved from melamine deaminase (triA encoded), which has very small promiscuous activity toward atrazine, a man-made chemical.

== Introduction ==
Enzymes are evolved to catalyze a particular reaction on a particular substrate with high catalytic efficiency (k_{cat}/K_{M}, cf. Michaelis–Menten kinetics). However, in addition to this main activity, they possess other activities that are generally several orders of magnitude lower, and that are not a result of evolutionary selection and therefore do not partake in the physiology of the organism. (Note: Most authors refer to as promiscuous activities the non-evolved activities and not secondary activities that have been evolved. Consequently, glutathione S-transferases (GSTs) and cytochrome P450 monooxygenases (CYPs) are termed multispecific or broad-specificity enzymes. The ability to catalyse different reactions is often termed catalytic promiscuity or reaction promiscuity, whereas the ability to act upon different substrates is called substrate promiscuity or substrate ambiguity. The term latent has different meanings depending on the author, namely either referring to a promiscuous activity that arises when one or two residues are mutated or simply as a synonym for promiscuous to avoid the latter term. Promiscuity here means muddledom, not lechery —the latter is a recently gained meaning of the word.) This phenomenon allows new functions to be gained as the promiscuous activity could confer a fitness benefit under a new selective pressure leading to its duplication and selection as a new main activity.

== Enzyme evolution ==
=== Duplication and divergence ===
Several theoretical models exist to predict the order of duplication and specialisation events, but the actual process is more intertwined and fuzzy (§ Reconstructed enzymes below). On one hand, gene amplification results in an increase in enzyme concentration, and potentially freedom from a restrictive regulation, therefore increasing the reaction rate (v) of the promiscuous activity of the enzyme making its effects more pronounced physiologically ("gene dosage effect"). On the other, enzymes may evolve an increased secondary activity with little loss to the primary activity ("robustness") with little adaptive conflict (§ Robustness and plasticity below).

=== Robustness and plasticity ===
A study of four distinct hydrolases (human serum paraoxonase (PON1), pseudomonads phosphotriesterase (PTE), Protein tyrosine phosphatase(PTP) and human carbonic anhydrase II (CAII)) has shown the main activity is "robust" towards change, whereas the promiscuous activities are weak and more "plastic". Specifically, selecting for an activity that is not the main activity (via directed evolution), does not initially diminish the main activity (hence its robustness), but greatly affects the non-selected activities (hence their plasticity).

The phosphotriesterase (PTE) from Pseudomonas diminuta was evolved to become an arylesterase (P–O to C–O hydrolase) in eighteen rounds gaining a 10^{9} shift in specificity (ratio of K_{M}), however most of the change occurred in the initial rounds, where the unselected vestigial PTE activity was retained and the evolved arylesterase activity grew, while in the latter rounds there was a little trade-off for the loss of the vestigial PTE activity in favour of the arylesterase activity.

This means firstly that a specialist enzyme (monofunctional) when evolved goes through a generalist stage (multifunctional), before becoming a specialist again—presumably after gene duplication according to the IAD model—and secondly that promiscuous activities are more plastic than the main activity.

=== Reconstructed enzymes ===
The most recent and most clear cut example of enzyme evolution is the rise of bioremediating enzymes in the past 60 years. Due to the very low number of amino acid changes, these provide an excellent model to investigate enzyme evolution in nature. However, using extant enzymes to determine how the family of enzymes evolved has the drawback that the newly evolved enzyme is compared to paralogues without knowing the true identity of the ancestor before the two genes diverged. This issue can be resolved thanks to ancestral reconstruction. First proposed in 1963 by Linus Pauling and Emile Zuckerkandl, ancestral sequence reconstruction is the inference and synthesis of a gene from the ancestral form of a group of genes, which has had a recent revival thanks to improved inference techniques and low-cost artificial gene synthesis, resulting in several ancestral enzymes—dubbed "stemzymes" by some—to be studied.

Evidence gained from reconstructed enzyme suggests that the order of the events where the novel activity is improved and the gene is duplication is not clear cut, unlike what the theoretical models of gene evolution suggest.

One study showed that the ancestral gene of the immune defence protease family in mammals had a broader specificity and a higher catalytic efficiency than the contemporary family of paralogues, whereas another study showed that the ancestral steroid receptor of vertebrates was an oestrogen receptor with slight substrate ambiguity for other hormones—indicating that these probably were not synthesised at the time.

This variability in ancestral specificity has not only been observed between different genes, but also within the same gene family. In light of the large number of paralogous fungal α-glucosidase genes with a number of specific maltose-like (maltose, turanose, maltotriose, maltulose and sucrose) and isomaltose-like (isomaltose and palatinose) substrates, a study reconstructed all key ancestors and found that the last common ancestor of the paralogues was mainly active on maltose-like substrates with only trace activity for isomaltose-like sugars, despite leading to a lineage of iso-maltose glucosidases and a lineage that further split into maltose glucosidases and iso-maltose glucosidases. Antithetically, the ancestor before the latter split had a more pronounced isomaltose-like glucosidase activity.

== Primordial metabolism ==
Roy Jensen in 1976 theorised that primordial enzymes had to be highly promiscuous in order for metabolic networks to assemble in a patchwork fashion (hence its name, the patchwork model). This primordial catalytic versatility was later lost in favour of highly catalytic specialised orthologous enzymes. As a consequence, many central-metabolic enzymes have structural homologues that diverged before the last universal common ancestor.

== Distribution ==
Promiscuity is not only a first trait, but also a very widespread property in modern genomes. A series of experiments have been conducted to assess the distribution of promiscuous enzyme activities in E. coli. In E. coli 21 out of 104 single-gene knockouts tested (from the Keio collection) could be rescued by overexpressing a noncognate E. coli protein (using a pooled set of plasmids of the ASKA collection). The mechanisms by which the noncognate ORF could rescue the knockout can be grouped into eight categories: isozyme overexpression (homologues), substrate ambiguity, transport ambiguity (scavenging), catalytic promiscuity, metabolic flux maintenance (including overexpression of the large component of a synthase in the absence of the amine transferase subunit), pathway bypass, regulatory effects and unknown mechanisms. Similarly, overexpressing the ORF collection allowed E. coli to gain over an order of magnitude in resistance in 86 out 237 toxic environment.

== Homology ==
Homologues are sometimes known to display promiscuity towards each other's main reactions. This crosswise promiscuity has been most studied with members of the alkaline phosphatase superfamily, which catalyse hydrolytic reaction on the sulfate, phosphonate, monophosphate, diphosphate or triphosphate ester bond of several compounds. Despite the separation the homologues have a varying degree of reciprocal promiscuity: the differences in promiscuity are due to mechanisms involved, particularly the intermediate required.

== Degree of promiscuity ==
Enzymes are generally in a state that is not only a compromise between stability and catalytic efficiency, but also for specificity and evolvability, the latter two dictating whether an enzyme is a generalist (highly evolvable due to large promiscuity, but low main activity) or a specialist (high main activity, poorly evolvable due to low promiscuity). Examples of these are enzymes for primary and secondary metabolism in plants (§ Plant secondary metabolism below). Other factors can come into play, for example the glycerophosphodiesterase (gpdQ) from Enterobacter aerogenes shows different values for its promiscuous activities depending on the two metal ions it binds, which is dictated by ion availability. In some cases promiscuity can be increased by relaxing the specificity of the active site by enlarging it with a single mutation as was the case of a D297G mutant of the E. coli L-Ala-D/L-Glu epimerase (ycjG) and E323G mutant of a pseudomonad muconate lactonizing enzyme II, allowing them to promiscuously catalyse the activity of O-succinylbenzoate synthase (menC). Conversely, promiscuity can be decreased as was the case of γ-humulene synthase (a sesquiterpene synthase) from Abies grandis that is known to produce 52 different sesquiterpenes from farnesyl diphosphate upon several mutations.

Studies on enzymes with broad-specificity—not promiscuous, but conceptually close—such as mammalian trypsin and chymotrypsin, and the bifunctional isopropylmalate isomerase/homoaconitase from Pyrococcus horikoshii have revealed that active site loop mobility contributes substantially to the catalytic elasticity of the enzyme.

=== Toxicity ===
A promiscuous activity is a non-native activity the enzyme did not evolve to do, but arises due to an accommodating conformation of the active site. However, the main activity of the enzyme is a result not only of selection towards a high catalytic rate towards a particular substrate to produce a particular product, but also to avoid the production of toxic or unnecessary products. For example, if a tRNA synthesis loaded an incorrect amino acid onto a tRNA, the resulting peptide would have unexpectedly altered properties, consequently to enhance fidelity several additional domains are present. Similar in reaction to tRNA synthesis, the first subunit of tyrocidine synthetase (tyrA) from Bacillus brevis adenylates a molecule of phenylalanine in order to use the adenyl moiety as a handle to produce tyrocidine, a cyclic non-ribosomal peptide. When the specificity of enzyme was probed, it was found that it was highly selective against natural amino acids that were not phenylalanine, but was much more tolerant towards unnatural amino acids. Specifically, most amino acids were not catalysed, whereas the next most catalysed native amino acid was the structurally similar tyrosine, but at a thousandth as much as phenylalanine, whereas several unnatural amino acids where catalysed better than tyrosine, namely D-phenylalanine, β-cyclohexyl-L-alanine, 4-amino-L-phenylalanine and L-norleucine.

One peculiar case of selected secondary activity are polymerases and restriction endonucleases, where incorrect activity is actually a result of a compromise between fidelity and evolvability. For example, for restriction endonucleases incorrect activity (star activity) is often lethal for the organism, but a small amount allows new functions to evolve against new pathogens.

=== Plant secondary metabolism ===
Anthocyanins (delphinidin pictured) confer plants, particularly their flowers, with a variety of colours to attract pollinators and a typical example of plant secondary metabolite.

Plants produce a large number of secondary metabolites thanks to enzymes that, unlike those involved in primary metabolism, are less catalytically efficient but have a larger mechanistic elasticity (reaction types) and broader specificities. The liberal drift threshold (caused by the low selective pressure due to the small population size) allows the fitness gain endowed by one of the products to maintain the other activities even though they may be physiologically useless.

== Biocatalysis ==
In biocatalysis, many reactions are sought that are absent in nature. To do this, enzymes with a small promiscuous activity towards the required reaction are identified and evolved via directed evolution or rational design.

An example of a commonly evolved enzyme is ω-transaminase which can replace a ketone with a chiral amine and consequently libraries of different homologues are commercially available for rapid biomining (eg. Codexis).

Another example is the possibility of using the promiscuous activities of cysteine synthase (cysM) towards nucleophiles to produce non-proteinogenic amino acids.

== Reaction similarity ==
Similarity between enzymatic reactions (EC) can be calculated by using bond changes, reaction centres or substructure metrics (EC-BLAST).

== Drugs and promiscuity ==
Whereas promiscuity is mainly studied in terms of standard enzyme kinetics, drug binding and subsequent reaction is a promiscuous activity as the enzyme catalyses an inactivating reaction towards a novel substrate it did not evolve to catalyse. This could be because of the demonstration that there are only a small number of distinct ligand binding pockets in proteins.

Mammalian xenobiotic metabolism, on the other hand, was evolved to have a broad specificity to oxidise, bind and eliminate foreign lipophilic compounds which may be toxic, such as plant alkaloids, so their ability to detoxify anthropogenic xenobiotics is an extension of this.

== See also ==
- Evolution by gene duplication
- Michaelis–Menten kinetics
- Molecular promiscuity
- Protein moonlighting
- Susumu Ohno
