= IDH2 =

Protein-coding gene in humans

Identifiers
- Aliases: IDH2, D2HGA2, ICD-M, IDH, IDHM, IDP, IDPM, mNADP-IDH, isocitrate dehydrogenase (NADP(+)) 2, mitochondrial, isocitrate dehydrogenase (NADP(+)) 2, IDH-2
- External IDs: OMIM: 147650; MGI: 96414; GeneCards: IDH2
Available structures
PDB	Ortholog search: PDBe RCSB
PDB	List of PDB id codes 4JA8
Enzyme activity
EC #	BRENDA	ExPASy	KEGG	MetaCyc
1.1.1.42	↗	↗	↗	↗

Gene location (Human)
Chr.	Chromosome 15 (human)
Band	15q26.1	Start	90,083,045 bp
Band	15q26.1	End	90,102,477 bp

Gene location (Mouse)
Chr.	Chromosome 7 (mouse)
Band	7 D2|7 45.43 cM	Start	79,744,594 bp
Band	7 D2|7 45.43 cM	End	79,765,140 bp
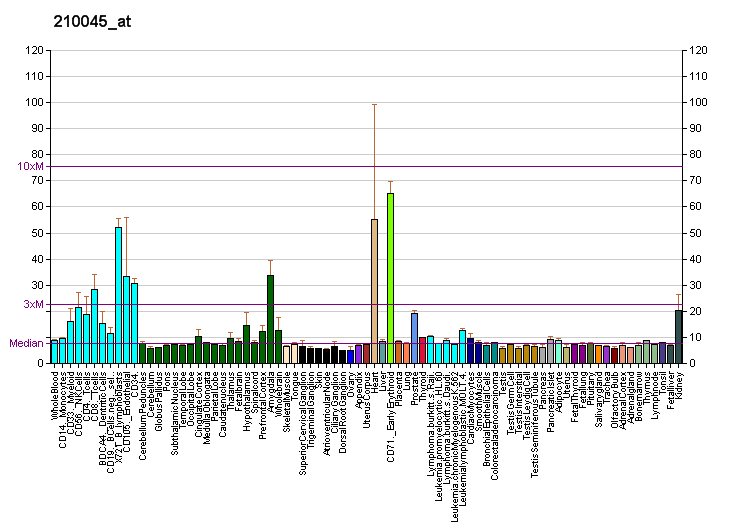

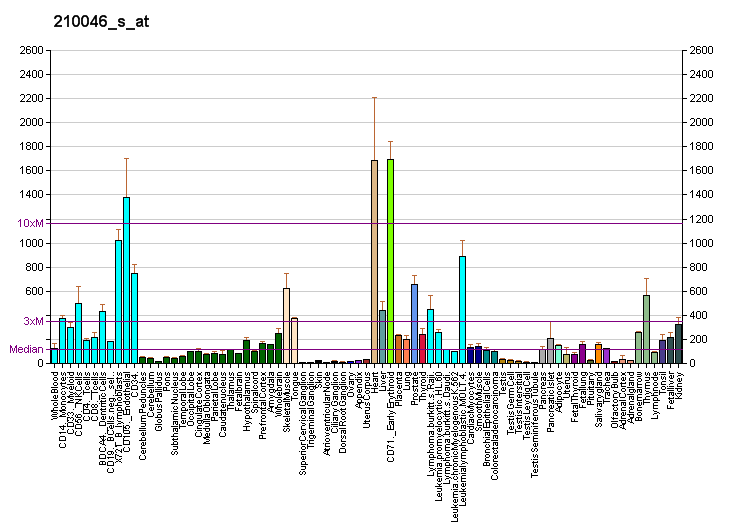
RNA expression pattern
Bgee	Human / Mouse (ortholog); Top expressed in: apex of heart; gastrocnemius muscle; muscle of thigh; body of tongue; vastus lateralis muscle; triceps brachii muscle; left ventricle; skeletal muscle tissue; glutes; Skeletal muscle tissue of biceps brachii / Top expressed in: right ventricle; right kidney; myocardium of ventricle; cardiac muscle tissue of left ventricle; atrium; plantaris muscle; soleus muscle; atrioventricular valve; thoracic diaphragm; otic vesicle; More reference expression data
BioGPS	More reference expression data
Gene ontology
Molecular function	oxidoreductase activity, acting on the CH-OH group of donors, NAD or NADP as acceptor; oxidoreductase activity; isocitrate dehydrogenase activity; NAD binding; magnesium ion binding; metal ion binding; isocitrate dehydrogenase (NADP+) activity; protein homodimerization activity
Cellular component	mitochondrial inner membrane; cytosol; mitochondrial matrix; peroxisome; extracellular exosome; mitochondrion
Biological process	2-oxoglutarate metabolic process; glyoxylate cycle; isocitrate metabolic process; tricarboxylic acid cycle; NADP biosynthetic process; negative regulation of glial cell proliferation; negative regulation of glial cell migration; negative regulation of matrix metallopeptidase secretion; mitochondrion organization; carbohydrate metabolic process; NADP metabolic process
Sources:Amigo / QuickGO
Orthologs
Databases	NCBI: entry; OMA: entry
Species	Human	Mouse
Entrez	3418	269951
Ensembl	ENSG00000182054	ENSMUSG00000030541
UniProt	P48735	P54071
RefSeq (mRNA)	NM_002168; NM_001289910; NM_001290114	NM_173011
RefSeq (protein)	NP_001276839; NP_001277043; NP_002159	NP_766599
Location (UCSC)	Chr 15: 90.08 – 90.1 Mb	Chr 7: 79.74 – 79.77 Mb
PubMed search
- Wikidata
View/Edit Human	View/Edit Mouse

Isocitrate dehydrogenase [NADP], mitochondrial is an enzyme that in humans is encoded by the IDH2 gene.

Isocitrate dehydrogenases are enzymes that catalyze the oxidative decarboxylation of isocitrate to 2-oxoglutarate. These enzymes belong to two distinct subclasses, one of which utilizes NAD(+) as the electron acceptor and the other NADP(+). Five isocitrate dehydrogenases have been reported: three NAD(+)-dependent isocitrate dehydrogenases, which localize to the mitochondrial matrix, and two NADP(+)-dependent isocitrate dehydrogenases, one of which is mitochondrial and the other predominantly cytosolic. Each NADP(+)-dependent isozyme is a homodimer. The protein encoded by the IDH2 gene is the NADP(+)-dependent isocitrate dehydrogenase found in the mitochondria. It plays a role in intermediary metabolism and energy production. This protein may tightly associate or interact with the pyruvate dehydrogenase complex. Somatic mosaic mutations of this gene have also been found associated to Ollier disease and Maffucci syndrome.

== Structure ==
Isocitrate dehydrogenase is composed of three subunits, allosterically regulated, and requires an integrated Mg^{2+} or Mn^{2+} ion. The mitochondrial form of IDH, like most isoforms, is a homodimer, in which two identical monomer subunits form one unit. The structure of Mycobacterium tuberculosis IDH-1 bound with NADPH and Mn^{2+} has been solved by X-ray crystallography. It is a homodimer in which each subunit has a Rossmann fold, and a common top domain of interlocking β sheets. Mtb IDH-1 is most structurally similar to the R132H mutant human IDH found in certain glioblastomas. Similar to human R132H ICDH, Mtb ICDH-1 also catalyzes the formation of α-hydroxyglutarate.

== Function ==
Isocitrate dehydrogenase is a digestive enzyme that is used in the citric acid cycle. Its main function is to catalyze the oxidative decarboxylation of isocitrate into alpha-ketoglutarate. Human isocitrate dehydrogenase regulation is not fully understood however, it is known that NADP and Ca2+ bind in the active site to create three different conformations. These conformations form in the active site and are as follows: a loop is form in the inactive enzyme, a partially unraveled alpha helix in the semi open form, and an alpha helix in the active form.

== Clinical significance ==
The mitochondrial form of IDH2 is correlated with many diseases. Mutations in IDH2 are associated with 2-hydroxyglutaric aciduria, a condition that causes progressive damage to the brain. The major types of this disorder are called D-2-hydroxyglutaric aciduria (D-2-HGA), L-2-hydroxyglutaric aciduria (L-2-HGA), and combined D,L-2-hydroxyglutaric aciduria (D,L-2-HGA). The main features of D-2-HGA are delayed development, seizures, weak muscle tone (hypotonia), and abnormalities in the largest part of the brain (the cerebrum), which controls many important functions such as muscle movement, speech, vision, thinking, emotion, and memory. Researchers have described two subtypes of D-2-HGA, type I and type II. The two subtypes are distinguished by their genetic cause and pattern of inheritance, although they also have some differences in signs and symptoms. Type II tends to begin earlier and often causes more severe health problems than type I. Type II may also be associated with a weakened and enlarged heart (cardiomyopathy), a feature that is typically not found with type I. L-2-HGA particularly affects a region of the brain called the cerebellum, which is involved in coordinating movements. As a result, many affected individuals have problems with balance and muscle coordination (ataxia). Additional features of L-2-HGA can include delayed development, seizures, speech difficulties, and an unusually large head (macrocephaly). Typically, signs and symptoms of this disorder begin during infancy or early childhood. The disorder worsens over time, usually leading to severe disability by early adulthood. Combined D,L-2-HGA causes severe brain abnormalities that become apparent in early infancy. Affected infants have severe seizures, weak muscle tone (hypotonia), and breathing and feeding problems. They usually survive only into infancy or early childhood.

Mutations in the IDH2 gene, along with mutations in the IDH1 gene, are also strongly correlated with the development of glioma, acute myeloid leukemia (AML), chondrosarcoma, intrahepatic cholangiocarcinoma (ICC), and angioimmunoblastic T-cell lymphoma cancers. They also cause D-2-hydroxyglutaric aciduria and Ollier and Maffucci syndromes. IDH2 mutations may allow prolonged survival of glioma and ICC cancer cells, but not AML cells. The reason for this is unknown. Missense mutations in the active site of these IDH2 induce a neo-enzymatic reaction wherein NADPH reduces αKG to D-2-hydroxyglutarate, which accumulates and leads to the inhibition of hypoxia-inducible factor 1α (HIF1α) degradation (inhibition of the HIF prolyl-hydroxylase), as well as changes in epigenetics and extracellular matrix homeostasis. Such mutations also imply less NADPH production capacity. Tumors of various tissue types with IDH1/2 mutations show improved responses to radiation and chemotherapy.

Inhibitors of the neomorphic activity of mutant IDH1 and IDH2 are currently in Phase I/II clinical trials for both solid and blood tumors. As IDH1 and IDH2 represent key enzymes within the tricarboxylic acid (TCA) cycle, mutations have significant impact on intermediary metabolism. The loss of some wild-type metabolic activity is an important, potentially deleterious and therapeutically exploitable consequence of oncogenic IDH mutations and requires continued investigation in the future.

== As a drug target ==
Drugs that target mutated forms of IDH2 include enasidenib and vorasidenib.

Enasidenib was approved for medical use in the United States in August 2017. The US Food and Drug Administration (FDA) considers it to be a first-in-class medication.

Vorasidenib was approved for medical use in the United States in August 2024. Vorasidenib is the first approval by the FDA of a systemic therapy for people with grade 2 astrocytoma or oligodendroglioma with a susceptible isocitrate dehydrogenase-2 or isocitrate dehydrogenase-2 mutation.

== Interactive pathway map ==
Click on genes, proteins and metabolites below to link to respective articles. (Note: The interactive pathway map can be edited at WikiPathways: "TCACycle_WP78".)

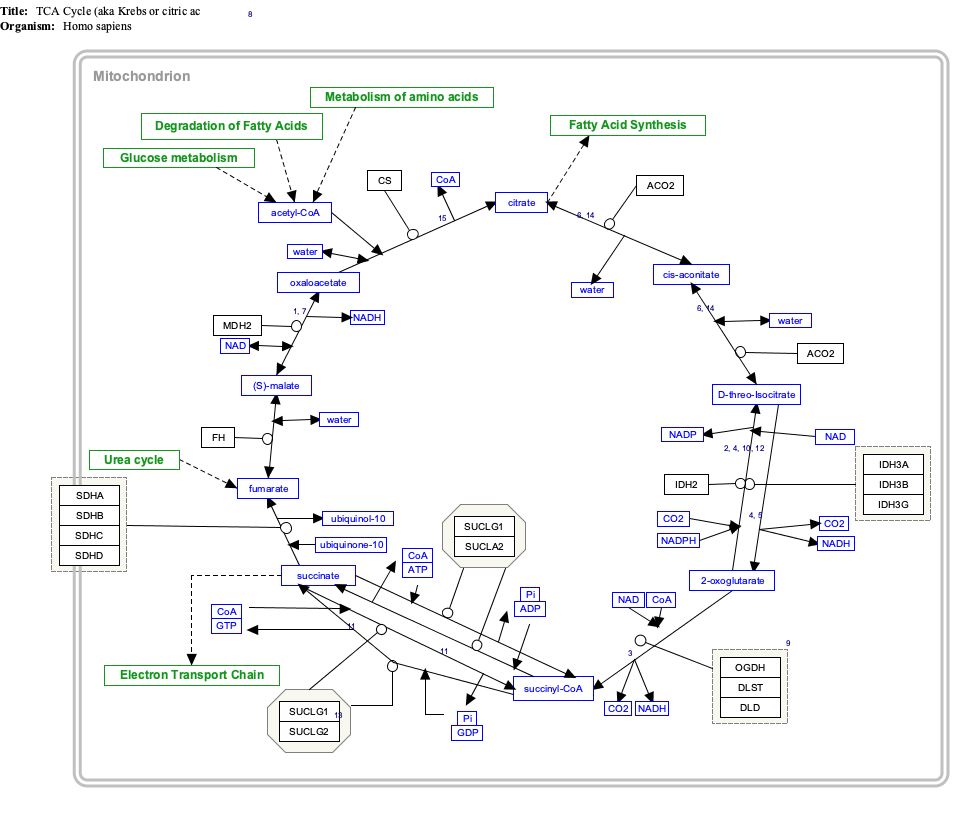

TCACycle_WP78 edit
