= 2-hydroxyglutarate dehydrogenase =

2-hydroxyglutarage dehydrogenase may refer to the following:

- L-2-hydroxyglutarate dehydrogenase, an enzyme
- D-2-hydroxyglutarate dehydrogenase, an enzyme
