= IPM =

IPM may refer to:

== Organizations ==
- Independence Party of Minnesota, a political party in Minnesota, United States
- Institute for Research in Fundamental Sciences, formerly the Institute for Studies in Theoretical Physics and Mathematics, a research institute in Tehran, Iran
- Institute of Personnel Management, now the Chartered Institute of Personnel and Development
- International Partnership for Microbicides, a non-profit partnership to find a safe and effective microbicide

== Science and technology ==
- Imipenem, an antibiotic belonging to the carbapenem class of drugs
- Inch per minute, a measure of speed or velocity
- Independent-particle model, of nuclear structure (structure of the atomic nucleus)
- Integrated power module, a fuse box in an automobile
- Integrated pest management, a pest control strategy in agriculture
- Interior permanent magnet, the type of motor used in a hybrid electric vehicle
- Interior-point method in mathematical programming (optimization)
- International prototype metre, a former standard to define the length of a metre
- Interplanetary medium, the material which fills the Solar System
- Intranodal palisaded myofibroblastoma, a rare primary lymph node tumour
- Isopropyl myristate, a chemical used in cosmetics and perfumes
- InfoPrint Manager, IBM Advanced Function Presentation software
- IPM (software), Interactive Policy Making, an online opinion poll management system
- Intelligent Power Module, a type of high-performance module designed to drive IGBT devices

== Other uses ==
- iPM, a spin-off program of BBC Radio 4's PM
- IPM Zmaj, a Serbian company that produces small agricultural machines
- Information Processing and Management, academic journal
- Inquisition post mortem, an English medieval and post-medieval fiscal record of the death and estate of a tenant-in-chief
- Integrated Project Management, a process area in CMMI
- Immediate Past Master, the previous Worshipful Master of a masonic lodge
- Imperial Porcelain Factory, Saint Petersburg or (IPM)
- Indian Police Medal, a medal for gallantry and distinguished service
- International Plowing Match, a Canadian agricultural fair
- Macao Polytechnic Institute (Instituto Politécnico de Macau)

== See also ==
- IIPM (disambiguation)
- IPMS (disambiguation)
