= Bob Dole =

American politician and attorney (1923–2021)

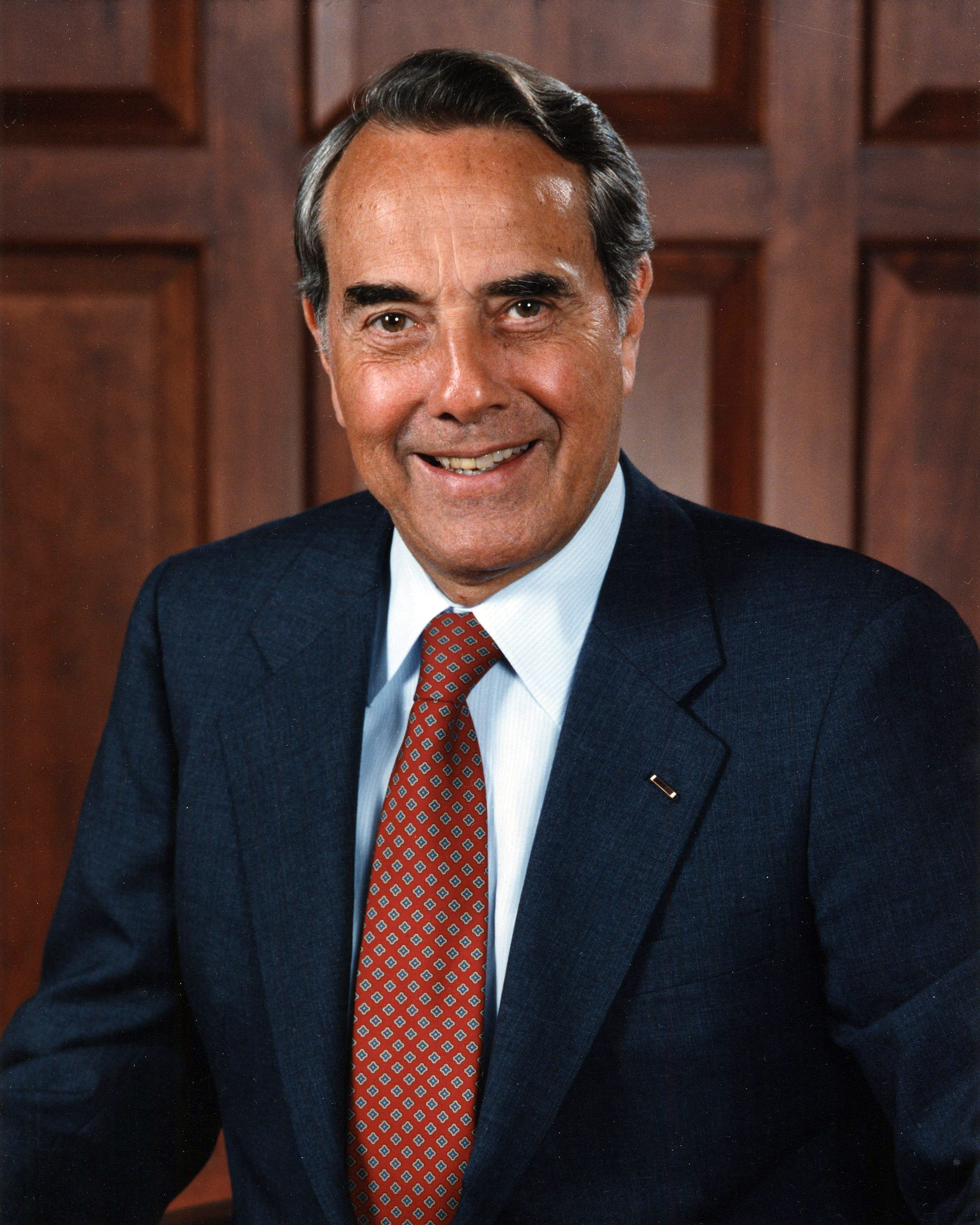
- Official portrait, c. 1980

Senate Majority Leader
- In office January 3, 1995 – June 11, 1996
- Whip: Trent Lott
- Preceded by: George Mitchell
- Succeeded by: Trent Lott
- In office January 3, 1985 – January 3, 1987
- Whip: Alan Simpson
- Preceded by: Howard Baker
- Succeeded by: Robert Byrd
Other Senate positions
Senate Minority Leader
In office January 3, 1987 – January 3, 1995
Whip	Alan Simpson
Preceded by	Robert Byrd
Succeeded by	Tom Daschle
Leader of the Senate Republican Conference
In office January 3, 1985 – June 11, 1996
Preceded by	Howard Baker
Succeeded by	Trent Lott
Chair of the Senate Finance Committee
In office January 3, 1981 – January 3, 1985
Preceded by	Russell B. Long
Succeeded by	Bob Packwood
Ranking Member of the Senate Agriculture Committee
In office January 3, 1975 – January 3, 1979
Preceded by	Carl Curtis
Succeeded by	Jesse Helms

United States Senator from Kansas
- In office January 3, 1969 – June 11, 1996
- Preceded by: Frank Carlson
- Succeeded by: Sheila Frahm

47th Chair of the Republican National Committee
- In office January 15, 1971 – January 19, 1973
- Preceded by: Rogers Morton
- Succeeded by: George H. W. Bush

Member of the U.S. House of Representatives from Kansas
- In office January 3, 1961 – January 3, 1969
- Preceded by: Wint Smith
- Succeeded by: Keith Sebelius
- Constituency: 6th district (1961–1963); 1st district (1963–1969)

Member of the Kansas House of Representatives from the 81st district
- In office January 9, 1951 – January 13, 1953
- Preceded by: Elmo Mahoney
- Succeeded by: R. C. Williams

Personal details
- Born: Robert Joseph Dole; July 22, 1923 Russell, Kansas, U.S.
- Died: December 5, 2021 (aged 98) Washington, D.C., U.S.
- Resting place: Arlington National Cemetery
- Party: Republican
- Spouses: Phyllis Holden (m. 1948; div. 1972); Elizabeth Hanford (m. 1975)
- Children: 1
- Education: Washburn University (BA, LLB)

Military service
- Branch/service: United States Army
- Years of service: 1942–1948
- Rank: Captain; Colonel
- Unit: 10th Mountain Division
- Wars: World War II (WIA)
- Awards: Purple Heart; Bronze Star Medal
- Dole's voice Dole discussing the legacy of veteran Senate reporters. Recorded April 29, 1988

Robert Joseph Dole (July 22, 1923 – December 5, 2021) was an American politician, attorney, and Army officer who represented Kansas in the United States Senate from 1969 to 1996. He was the Republican leader of the U.S. Senate during the final 11 years of his tenure, including three non-consecutive years as Majority Leader of the U.S. Senate. Prior to his 27 years in the Senate, he served in the United States House of Representatives from 1961 to 1969. Dole was also the Republican presidential nominee in the 1996 presidential election and the vice presidential nominee in the 1976 presidential election.

Dole was born and raised in Russell, Kansas, where he established a legal career after serving with distinction in the United States Army during World War II. Following a period as county attorney for Russell County, he won election to the House of Representatives in 1960, initially from Kansas's 6th congressional district and then from the 1st congressional district. He served this seat until 1968, when he was elected to the Senate, and was re-elected four more times there. In the Senate, Dole served as chairman of the Republican National Committee from 1971 to 1973 and chairman of the United States Senate Committee on Finance from 1981 to 1985. He led the U.S. Senate Republican members from 1985 to his resignation in 1996, and served as Senate Majority Leader from 1985 to 1987 and from 1995 to 1996. In his role as Republican leader, he helped defeat the Clinton health care plan of 1993, proposed by Democratic President Bill Clinton.

In 1976, President Gerald Ford selected Dole as his running mate for that year's presidential election after Vice President Nelson Rockefeller withdrew from seeking a full term. Their ticket was defeated by the Democratic ticket of Jimmy Carter and Walter Mondale in the general election. Dole sought the Republican presidential nomination in the 1980 United States presidential election, but quickly dropped out of the race. He experienced more success in the 1988 Republican presidential primaries but was defeated by Vice President George H. W. Bush. Dole won the Republican presidential nomination in 1996, selecting Jack Kemp as his running mate. The Dole–Kemp ticket lost the general election to incumbent President Clinton and Vice President Al Gore. Dole resigned from the Senate during his 1996 presidential campaign and did not seek public office again after the election.

Dole remained active after retiring from public office. His second wife Elizabeth served one term as U.S. Senator from North Carolina from 2003 to 2009. Dole also appeared in numerous commercials and television programs and served on various councils, including the advisory council for the Victims of Communism Memorial Foundation and special counsel at the Washington, D.C., office of law firm Alston & Bird. In 2012, he unsuccessfully advocated Senate ratification of the Convention on the Rights of Persons with Disabilities. Dole was the only former Republican presidential nominee to endorse Donald Trump in the 2016 and 2020 presidential elections, though he initially supported Jeb Bush in the 2016 Republican Party presidential primaries. Dole was awarded the Congressional Gold Medal on January 17, 2018.

== Early life and education ==
Dole was born on July 22, 1923, in Russell, Kansas, the son of Bina M. (née Talbott; 1904–1983) and Doran Ray Dole (1901–1975). His father, who had moved the family to Russell shortly before Robert was born, earned money by running a small creamery. One of Dole's father's customers was the father of his future U.S. Senate colleague Arlen Specter of Pennsylvania. The Doles lived in a house at 1035 North Maple in Russell and it remained his official residence throughout his political career.

Dole graduated from Russell High School in the spring of 1941 and enrolled at the University of Kansas the following fall. Dole had been a star high school athlete in Russell, and Kansas basketball coach Phog Allen traveled to Russell to recruit him to play for the Jayhawks basketball team. While at KU, Dole was on the basketball team, the track team, and the football team. In football, Dole played at the end position. In 1942 he was a teammate of the founder and longtime owner of the Tennessee Titans Bud Adams, Adams's only season playing football at Kansas. While in college, Dole joined the Kappa Sigma fraternity, and in 1970 he was bestowed with the fraternity's Man of the Year honor. Dole's collegiate studies were interrupted by World War II when he enlisted in the United States Army.

Dole attended the University of Arizona in Tucson from 1948 to 1949 before transferring to Washburn University in Topeka, Kansas, where he graduated with both undergraduate and law degrees in 1952.

== World War II and recovery ==
Dole joined the United States Army's Enlisted Reserve Corps in 1942 to fight in World War II. He was stationed at Brooklyn College in New York City from December 1943 through April 1944 as part of the Army Specialized Training Program before becoming a second lieutenant in the Army's 10th Mountain Division.

In April 1945, while engaged in combat near Castel d'Aiano in the Apennine mountains southwest of Bologna, Italy, Dole was seriously wounded by a German shell that struck his upper back and right arm, shattering his collarbone and part of his spine. "I lay face down in the dirt," Dole said. "I could not see or move my arms. I thought they were missing." As Lee Sandlin describes, when fellow soldiers saw the extent of his injuries, they believed all they could do was "give him the largest dose of morphine they dared and write an 'M' for 'morphine' on his forehead in his own blood, so that nobody else who found him would give him a second, fatal dose."

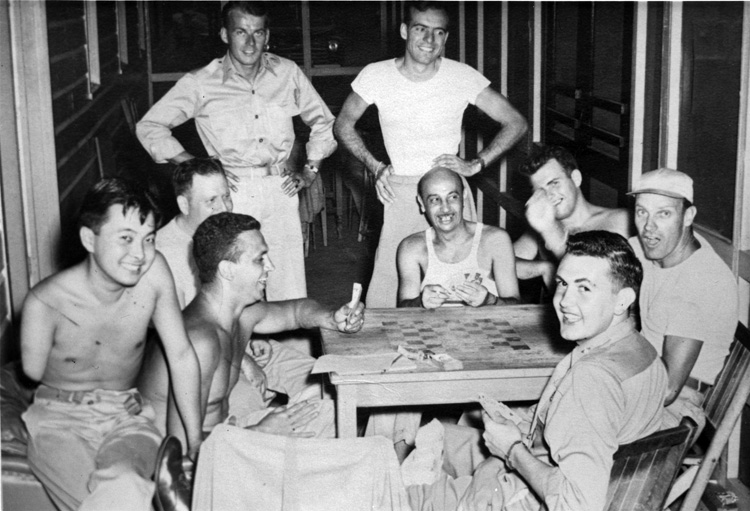
Friend and future senator Daniel Inouye (left) with Dole (next to Inouye) playing cards while recovering at Percy Jones Army Hospital (now Hart–Dole–Inouye Federal Center) in the mid-1940s.

Dole was paralyzed from the neck down and transported to a military hospital near Kansas. Having blood clots, a life-threatening infection, and a fever of almost 109 °F (43 °C), he was expected to die. After large doses of penicillin were not successful, he overcame the infection with the administration of streptomycin, one of the first-ever uses of that drug in a human. He remained despondent, "not ready to accept the fact that my life would be changed forever". He was encouraged to see Hampar Kelikian, an orthopedist in Chicago who had been working with veterans returning from war. Although during their first meeting Kelikian told Dole he would never be able to recover fully, the encounter changed Dole's outlook on life, who years later wrote of Kelikian, a survivor of the Armenian genocide, "Kelikian inspired me to focus on what I had left and what I could do with it rather than complaining about what had been lost." Dr. K, as Dole later came to affectionately call him, operated on him seven times, free of charge, and had, in Dole's words, "an impact on my life second only to my family".

Dole recovered from his wounds at Percy Jones Army Hospital in Battle Creek, Michigan, whose complex of federal buildings, no longer a hospital, is now named Hart–Dole–Inouye Federal Center in honor of three patients who became United States Senate members: Dole, Philip Hart from Michigan, and Daniel Inouye from Hawaii. Dole was decorated three times, receiving two Purple Heart medals for his injuries and the Bronze Star with "V" device for valor for his attempt to assist a downed radioman. The injuries left him with limited mobility in his right arm and numbness in his left arm. He minimized the effect in public by keeping a pen in his right hand and learned to write with his left hand. In 1947, he was medically discharged from the army as a captain.

== Early political career ==
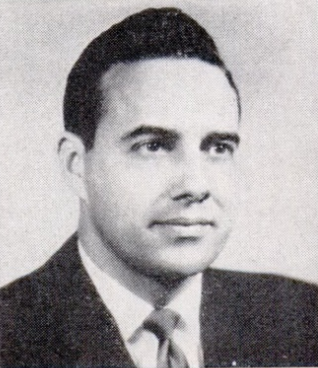
Official portrait, 1961

Dole ran for office for the first time in 1950 and was elected to the Kansas House of Representatives, serving a two-year term. During his term he served on the following committees: Assessment and Taxation, Gas and Oil, and Military Affairs and Soldiers Compensation. He became the county attorney for Russell County in 1953. Dole was elected to the United States House of Representatives from Kansas's 6th congressional district in 1960. After his first term, Kansas lost a congressional district, and most of Dole's district was merged with the neighboring 2nd district to form a new 1st district, encompassing much of central and western Kansas. Dole was elected from this merged district in 1962 and was re-elected two more times.

During his tenure in the House, Dole voted in favor of both the Civil Rights Act of 1964 and the Civil Rights Act of 1968 as well as the Twenty-fourth Amendment to the U.S. Constitution and the Voting Rights Act of 1965.

== U.S. Senate (1969–1996) ==
In 1968, Dole defeated former Governor of Kansas William H. Avery for the Republican nomination for United States Senate to succeed retiring Senate member Frank Carlson. He subsequently won the seat in the general election. Dole was re-elected in 1974, 1980, 1986, and 1992 before resigning on June 11, 1996, to focus on his presidential campaign.

While in the Senate, Dole served as chairman of the Republican National Committee from 1971 to 1973, as ranking Republican on the United States Senate Committee on Agriculture, Nutrition, and Forestry from 1975 to 1978, and as chairman of the United States Senate Committee on Finance from 1981 to 1985. In November 1984, Dole was elected Majority Leader of the United States Senate, defeating Ted Stevens 28–25 in the fourth round of balloting.

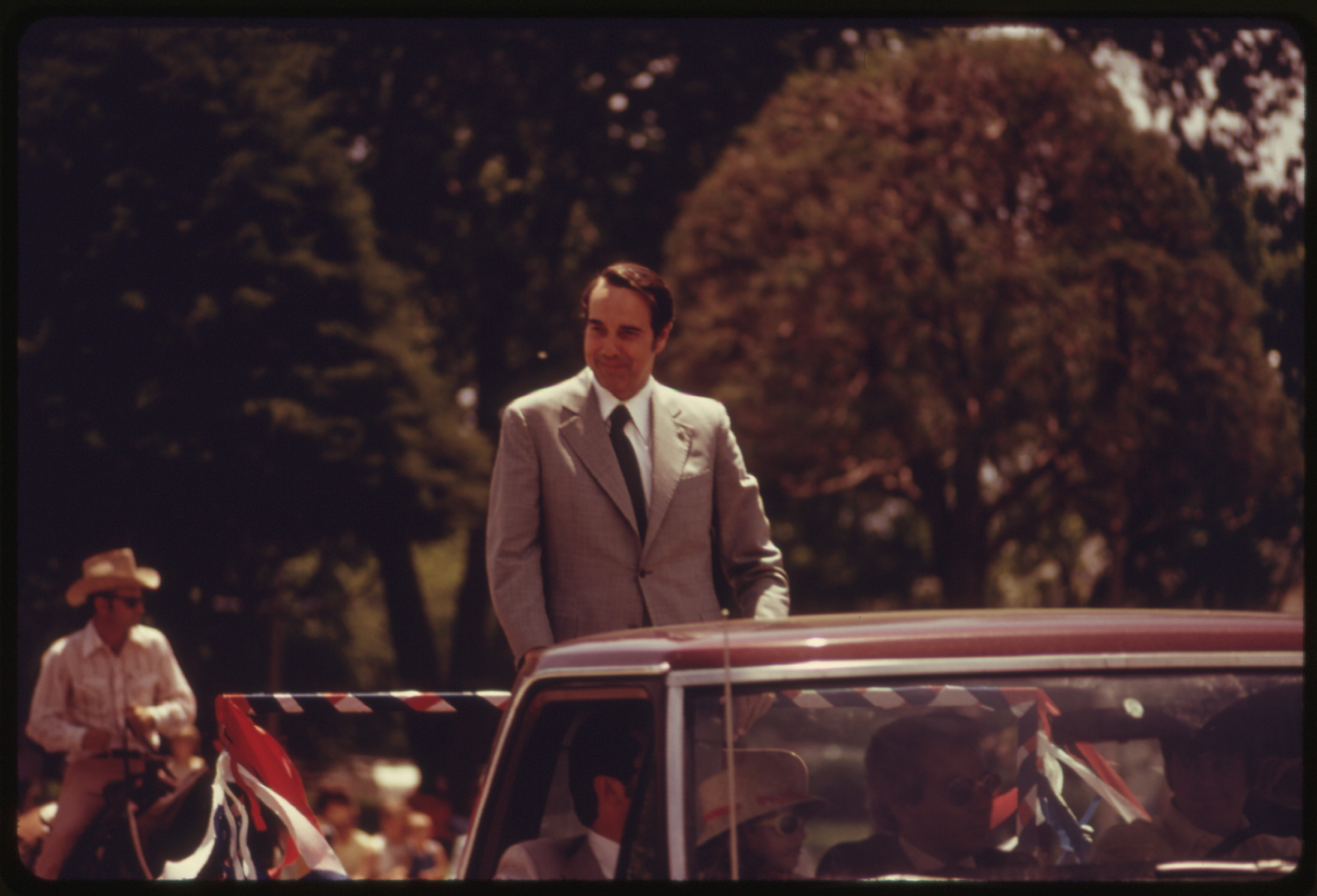
Dole in Emporia, Kansas, 1974. Photo by Patricia DuBose Duncan.

The continuing war in Vietnam was the dominant source of political division on Capitol Hill in the early 1970s; in 1970 Democratic U.S. Senator George McGovern of South Dakota took the Senate floor and condemned the role of the deliberative assembly in maintaining U.S. presence in Vietnam, saying the Senate chamber "reeks of blood", soon followed by freshman Republican senator Dole on the floor, who vociferously attacked McGovern. Dole was appointed chair of the Republican National Committee the next year. Over time in the Senate, Dole was seen by some as having a moderate voting record. During the following years of the 1970s, Dole and McGovern worked together on the Senate Hunger and Human Needs Committee. They partnered to help pass legislation making food stamps and school lunches more accessible and fraud more difficult. They expanded the school lunch program and helped establish the Special Supplemental Food Program for Women, Infants and Children (WIC), a federal assistance program for low-income pregnant women, breast-feeding women, and children under the age of five.

Dole served on congressional agriculture committees throughout the course of his political career, and became the Republican Party's chief spokesman on farm policy and nutrition issues in the Senate. When Ronald Reagan was elected president in 1980, Dole held the chairmanship of the Senate Agriculture Committee's Nutrition Subcommittee and the Senate Finance Committee. Together with McGovern, Dole spearheaded the elimination of the purchase requirement to receive food stamp benefits and the simplification of eligibility requirements.

Facing a reluctant President and Congress as chairman of the Senate Finance Committee in 1982, Dole was the driving force behind a large tax increase, promoting it as a reform measure to collect money owed by tax cheats and under-taxed businesses. In December of that year, The New York Times referred to Dole as changing from "hard-line conservative" to "mainstream Republicanism". He became Senate Majority leader in 1985 initially serving in that position for two years. Democrats took control of the Senate following the 1986 United States Senate elections, and Dole became Senate Minority Leader for the next eight years. Dole was a major supporter and advocate of the Americans with Disabilities Act of 1990.

The Republicans took control of both the Senate and House of Representatives in the 1994 midterm elections, due to the fallout from President Bill Clinton's policies including his health care plan, and Dole became Senate Majority Leader for the second time. In October 1995, a year before the presidential election, Dole and Speaker of the House Newt Gingrich led the Republican-controlled Congress to pass a spending bill that President Clinton vetoed, leading to the federal government shutdown from 1995 to 1996. On November 13, Republican and Democratic leaders, including Vice President Al Gore, Dick Armey, and Dole, met to try to resolve the budget and were unable to reach an agreement. By January 1996, Dole was more open to compromise to end the shutdown (as he was campaigning for the Republican presidential nomination), but he was opposed by other Republicans who wanted to continue until their demands were met. In particular, Gingrich and Dole had a tense working relationship as they were potential rivals for the 1996 Republican nomination. Clinton aide George Stephanopoulos cited the shutdown as having a role in Clinton's successful re-election campaign. In a January 3, 1996, Briefing Room address, amid the ongoing United States federal government shutdowns of 1995–1996, President Clinton noted Dole as a lawmaker that was "working together in good faith" to reopen the government.

From 1992 to 1996, Dole played a major role in mobilizing support for Bosnia and Herzegovina in the Senate, and pressuring the Clinton administration and NATO to resolve the war there.

In 1996, Dole was the first sitting Senate Party Leader to receive his party's nomination for president. He hoped to use his long experience in Senate procedures to maximize publicity from his rare positioning as Senate Majority Leader against an incumbent president but was stymied by Senate Democrats. Dole resigned his seat on June 11, 1996, to focus on the campaign, saying he had "nowhere to go but the White House or home".

== Involvement in presidential elections ==
=== 1976 presidential election ===
Dole ran unsuccessfully for vice president on a ticket headed by President Gerald Ford in 1976. Incumbent Vice President Nelson Rockefeller had announced the previous November his retirement from politics, opting against a run for a full term as vice president, and Dole was chosen as Ford's running mate. Dole was known for his sarcastic one-liner comments, often directed against himself, and during the vice presidential debate replied to U.S. Senate member Walter Mondale from Minnesota concerning the issues of Watergate scandal and the Pardon of Richard Nixon, "It is an appropriate topic, I guess, but it's not a very good issue any more than the war in Vietnam would be or World War II or World War I or the war in Korea—all Democrat wars, all in this century. I figured up the other day, if we added up the killed and wounded in Democrat wars in this century, it would be about 1.6 million Americans, enough to fill the city of Detroit." Many voters felt that Dole's criticism was unfairly harsh, and that his dispassionate delivery made him seem cold. Years later, Dole would remark that he regretted the comment, believing that it had hurt the Republican ticket.

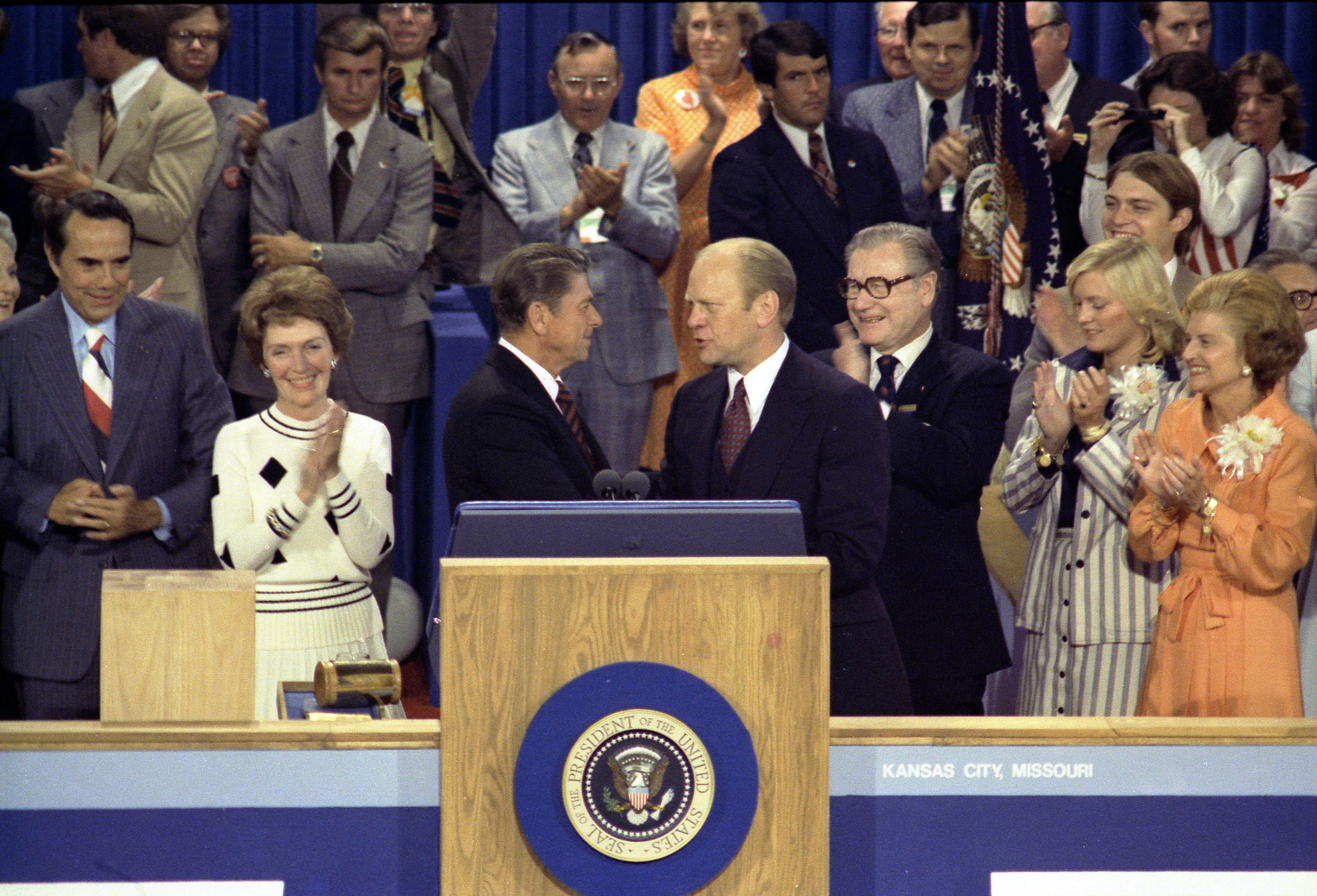
Bob Dole (far left) at the 1976 Republican National Convention in Kansas City with (from left) Nancy Reagan, Ronald Reagan, President Gerald Ford, Vice President Nelson Rockefeller, Susan Ford and Betty Ford

=== 1980 and 1988 presidential campaigns ===
Dole ran for the 1980 Republican presidential nomination, eventually won by Ronald Reagan. Despite Dole's national exposure from the '76 campaign, he finished behind Reagan, George H. W. Bush, and four others in Iowa and New Hampshire, receiving only 2.5% and 0.4% of votes cast in those contests, respectively. Dole ceased campaigning after the New Hampshire results and announced his formal withdrawal from the race on March 15, instead being re-elected to his third term as Senator that year.

Dole made another attempt for the Republican presidential nomination in 1988, formally announcing his candidacy in his hometown of Russell, Kansas, on November 9, 1987. At the ceremony, Dole was presented by the VFW with a cigar box, similar to the one he had used to collect donations for his war-related medical expenses, containing more than $7,000 in campaign donations. Dole started out strongly by defeating Vice President George H. W. Bush in the Iowa caucus—Bush finished third, behind television evangelist Pat Robertson.

During the 1988 primaries Dole won Iowa, Minnesota, South Dakota, Wyoming and his home state of Kansas. George H. W. Bush Bob Dole Pat Robertson

Bush defeated Dole in the New Hampshire primary a week later. After the returns had come in on the night of that primary, Dole appeared to lose his temper in a television interview with Tom Brokaw, saying Bush should "stop lying about my record", in response to a Bush commercial which accused Dole of "straddling" on taxes.

Despite a key endorsement by U.S. Senate member Strom Thurmond, Dole was defeated by Bush again in South Carolina in early March. Several days later, every southern state voted for Bush in a Super Tuesday sweep. This was followed by another loss in Illinois, which persuaded Dole to withdraw from the race.

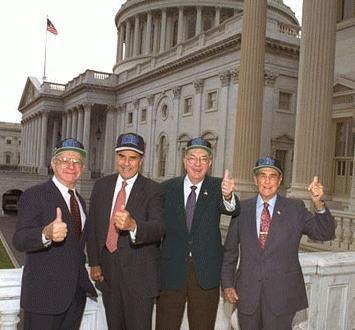
Dole along with Senators Lauch Faircloth, Jesse Helms, and Strom Thurmond show their enthusiasm for the Carolinas' new football team, 1993 – The Carolina Panthers

=== 1996 presidential election ===
Despite the 1994 elections, President Clinton's popularity soared due to a booming economy and public opinion polls supporting him in the 1995 budget shutdown. As a result, Clinton and Vice President Al Gore faced no serious opposition in the Democratic primaries. A few months before his death in April 1994, Richard Nixon warned Dole, "If the economy's good, you're not going to beat Clinton." Dole was the early front runner for the GOP nomination in the 1996 presidential race. At least eight candidates ran for the nomination. Dole was expected to win the nomination against underdog candidates such as the more conservative U.S. Senate member Phil Gramm of Texas and more moderate Senator Arlen Specter of Pennsylvania. Pat Buchanan upset Dole in the early New Hampshire primary, however, with Dole finishing second and former Governor of Tennessee Lamar Alexander finishing third. Speechwriter Kerry Tymchuk observed, "Dole was on the ropes because he wasn't conservative enough."

Dole eventually won the nomination, becoming the oldest first-time presidential nominee at the age of 73 years, 1 month (President Ronald Reagan was 73 years, 6 months in 1984, for his second presidential nomination). If elected, he would have become the oldest president to take office and the first Kansas native to become president (as Dwight D. Eisenhower was born in Texas). Dole found the initial draft of the nomination acceptance speech written by Mark Helprin too hardline, so Kerry Tymchuk, who was part of the "'Let Dole be Dole' crowd", revised the speech to cover the themes of honor, decency, and straight talk. It included the following line, a gibe at the all-or-nothing rookie Republicans who had ridden the 1994 midterm GOP wave into Congress: "In politics honorable compromise is no sin. It is what protects us from absolutism and intolerance"'.

In his acceptance speech, Dole stated, "Let me be the bridge to an America that only the unknowing call myth. Let me be the bridge to a time of tranquility, faith, and confidence in action," to which incumbent president Bill Clinton responded, "We do not need to build a bridge to the past, we need to build a bridge to the future."

As told in the Doles' joint biography, Unlimited Partners, speechwriter and biographer Kerry Tymchuk wrote "that he was going to make a statement. He was going to risk it all for the White House. He knew his time as leader was over. It would have been tough to come back [to the Senate as leader] if he lost in November. He knew it was time to move up or move out."

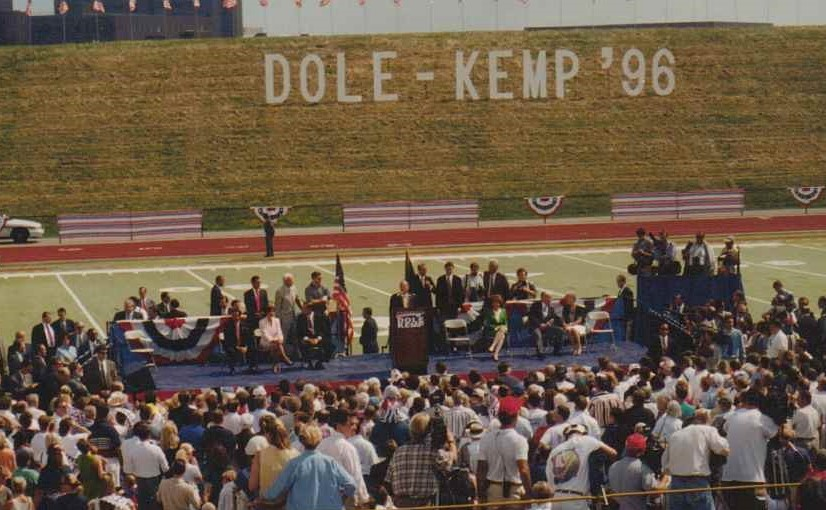
Dole–Kemp campaign rally at the State University of New York at Buffalo

Dole promised a 15% across-the-board reduction in income tax rates and made former U.S. representative and supply-side economics advocate Jack Kemp of New York his running mate for vice president. Dole himself was also a supporter of supply-side economics. Some commentators, including the Mises Institute, argued that aspects of his economic views were more Keynesian in nature; however, Jack Kemp rejected this interpretation. Dole had previously opposed supply-side economics before later embracing it.

Dole found himself criticized from both the left and the right within the Republican Party over the convention platform, one of the major issues being the inclusion of the Human Life Amendment. Clinton framed the narrative against Dole early, painting him as a mere clone of unpopular former Speaker of the United States House of Representatives Newt Gingrich, warning America that Dole would work in concert with the Republican Congress to slash popular social programs, like Medicare and Social Security, dubbed by Clinton as "Dole–Gingrich".

During the latter half of October 1996, Dole made a campaign appearance with Heather Whitestone, the first deaf Miss America, where both of them signed "I love you" to the crowd. Around that time, Dole and his advisers knew that they would lose the election, but in the last four days of the campaign they went on the "96-hour victory tour" to help Republican House candidates.

Dole lost, as pundits had long expected, to incumbent President Bill Clinton in the 1996 election. Clinton won in a 379–159 Electoral College landslide, capturing 49.2% of the vote against Dole's 40.7% and Ross Perot's 8.4%. As Nixon had predicted, Clinton was able to ride a booming economy to a second term in the White House.

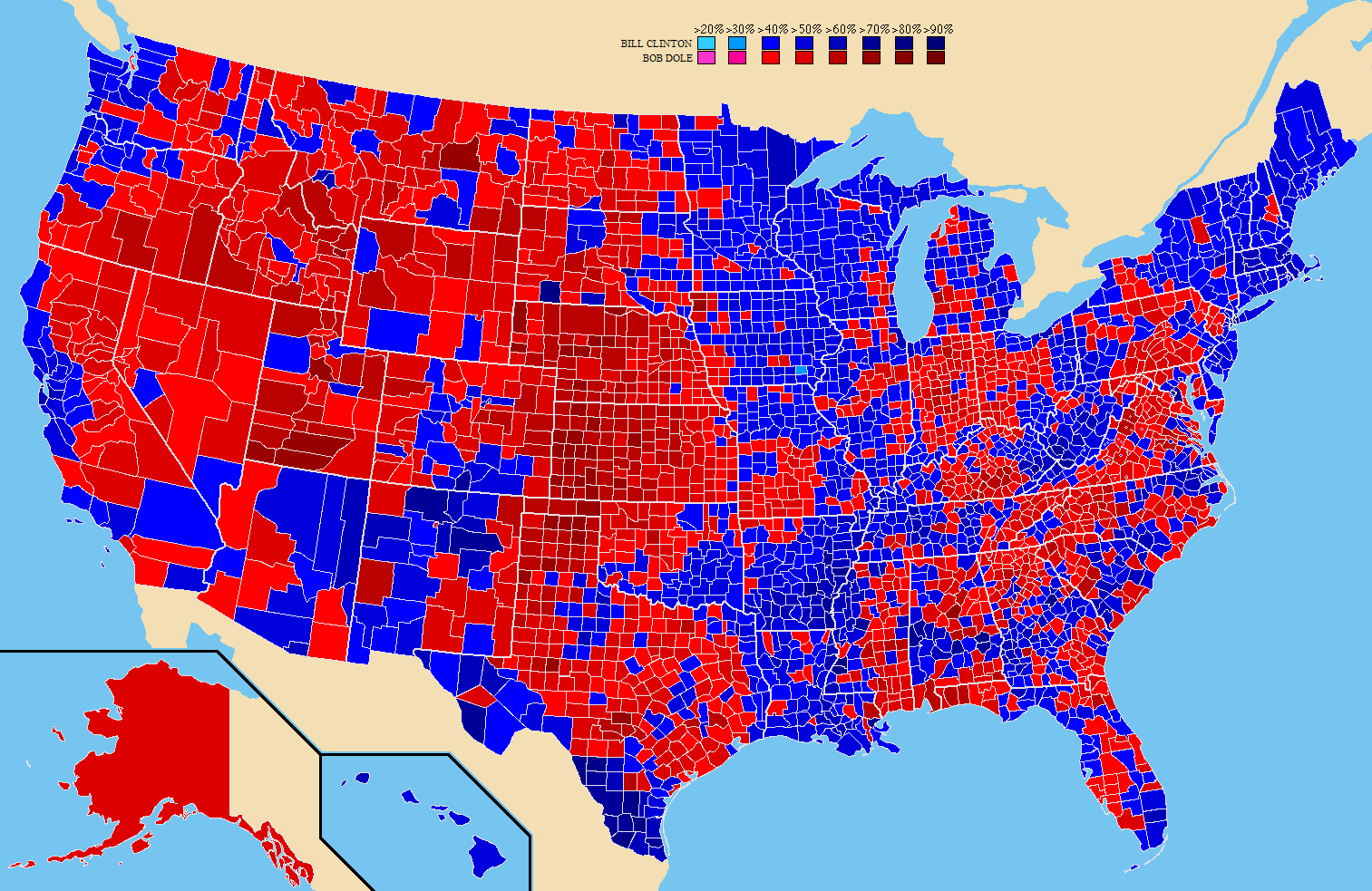
Election results by county Bill Clinton Bob Dole

Dole was the first losing vice presidential nominee to be nominated since Franklin D. Roosevelt. Dole's loss makes him the only person to lose elections for both the vice presidency and the presidency in the history of the United States. Dole was the last World War II veteran to have been the presidential nominee of a major party. During the campaign, Dole's advanced age was brought up, with critics stating that he was too old to be president.

In his election night concession speech, Dole remarked "I was thinking on the way down in the elevator – tomorrow will be the first time in my life I don't have anything to do." Dole later wrote "I was wrong. Seventy-two hours after conceding the election, I was swapping wisecracks with David Letterman on his late-night show." During the immediate aftermath of his 1996 loss to Clinton, Dole recalled that his critics thought that "I didn't loosen up enough, I didn't show enough leg. They said I was too serious . . . It takes several months to stop fretting about it and move on. But I did." Dole remarked that his decisive defeat to Clinton made it easier for him to be "magnanimous". On his decision to leave politics for good after the 1996 presidential election campaign, despite his guaranteed stature as a former Senate leader, Dole stated, "People were urging [me] to be a hatchet man against Clinton for the next four years. I couldn't see the point. Maybe after all those partisan fights, you look for more friendships. One of the nice things I've discovered is that when you're out of politics, you have more credibility with the other side . . . And you're out among all kinds of people, and that just doesn't happen often for an ex-president; he doesn't have the same freedom. So it hasn't been all bad."

== Post-political career ==
The 1996 presidential election, despite ending in a loss, opened up numerous opportunities for Dole owing in part to his sense of humor. He engaged in a career of writing, consulting, public speaking, and television appearances. Dole was the first defeated presidential nominee to become a political celebrity.

=== Television appearances ===
In November 1996, Dole appeared on Late Show with David Letterman and also made a cameo appearance on Saturday Night Live, parodying himself (shortly after losing the presidential election). He guest-starred as himself on NBC's Brooke Shields sitcom Suddenly Susan in January 1997.

Dole became a television commercial spokesman for such products as Viagra, Visa Inc, Dunkin' Donuts, and Pepsi (with Britney Spears). He was an occasional political commentator on the interview program Larry King Live, and was a guest a number of times on Comedy Central's satirical news program, The Daily Show. Dole was, for a short time in 2003, a commentator opposite Bill Clinton on CBS's 60 Minutes.

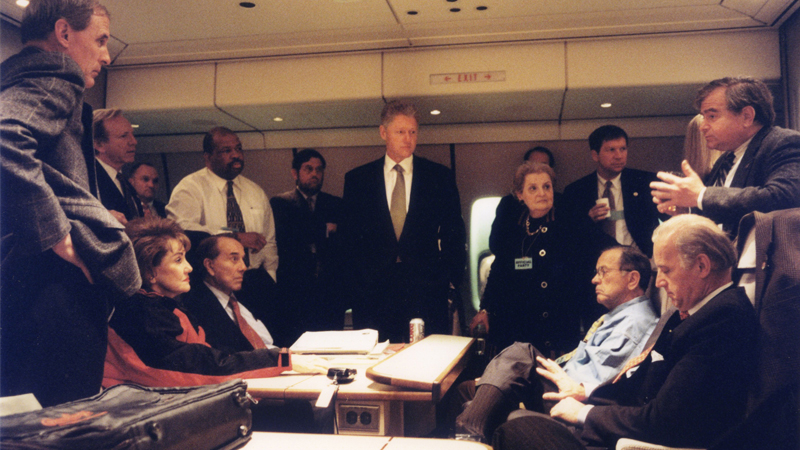
Dole and his wife, Elizabeth, accompanying President Bill Clinton, Senator (and future President) Joe Biden and other officials on a December 1997 trip to Bosnia and Herzegovina

=== Employment ===
After leaving office, Dole joined the Washington, D.C. firm Verner, Liipfert, Bernhard, McPherson and Hand, where he was a registered lobbyist on behalf of foreign governments (including those of Kosovo, Taiwan, and Slovenia); the American Society of Anesthesiologists; Tyco International; and the Chocolate Industry Coalition. In 2003, after Verner, Liipfert was acquired by DLA Piper, Dole joined the Washington, D.C. law and lobbying firm Alston & Bird, where he continued his lobbying career. While working for Alston & Bird, Dole was registered as a foreign agent under the Foreign Agents Registration Act in order to represent the government of the Republic of China in Washington.

Dole was head of the Federal City Council, a group of business, civic, education, and other leaders interested in economic development in Washington, D.C., from 1998 to 2002.

=== Volunteer work ===
Dole was also involved in many volunteer activities. He served as national chairman of the World War II Memorial Campaign, which raised funds for the building of the World War II Memorial. After being built, he visited the memorial on a weekly basis for many years to greet visitors and remember those who served.

Dole also teamed up with his former political rival, Bill Clinton, in 2001 on the Families of Freedom Foundation, a scholarship fund campaign to pay for the college educations for the families of 9/11 victims. It helped raise more than $100 million.

The Robert J. Dole Institute of Politics, housed on the University of Kansas campus in Lawrence, Kansas, was established to bring bipartisanship back to politics. The institute, which opened in July 2003 to coincide with Dole's 80th birthday, has featured such notable speakers as former President Bill Clinton, and awarded the inaugural Dole Leadership Prize to Rudy Giuliani for his leadership as the Mayor of New York City during the September 11 attacks in 2001.

Dole's legacy also includes a commitment to combating hunger, both in the United States and around the globe. In addition to numerous domestic programs, and along with former Senate member George McGovern (D-South Dakota), Dole created an international school lunch program through the McGovern-Dole International Food for Education and Child Nutrition Program, which, funded largely through the Congress, helps fight child hunger and poverty by providing nutritious meals to children in schools in developing countries. This internationally popular program would go on to provide more than 22 million meals to children in 41 countries in its first eight years. It has since led to greatly increased global interest in and support for school-feeding programs—which benefit girls and young women, in particular—and won McGovern and Dole the 2008 World Food Prize.

Dole offered the inaugural lecture to dedicate the University of Arkansas Clinton School of Public Service on September 18, 2004. During the lecture, he chronicled his life as a public servant and discussed the importance of public service related to defense, civil rights, the economy and daily life. Dole also gave the lecture as part Robert C. Vance Distinguished Lecture Series at Central Connecticut State University in 2008.

=== Author ===
Dole wrote several books, including one on jokes told by the presidents of the United States, in which he ranks the presidents according to their level of humor. Dole released his autobiography, One Soldier's Story: A Memoir, on April 12, 2005. The book chronicles his World War II experiences and his battle to survive his war injuries.

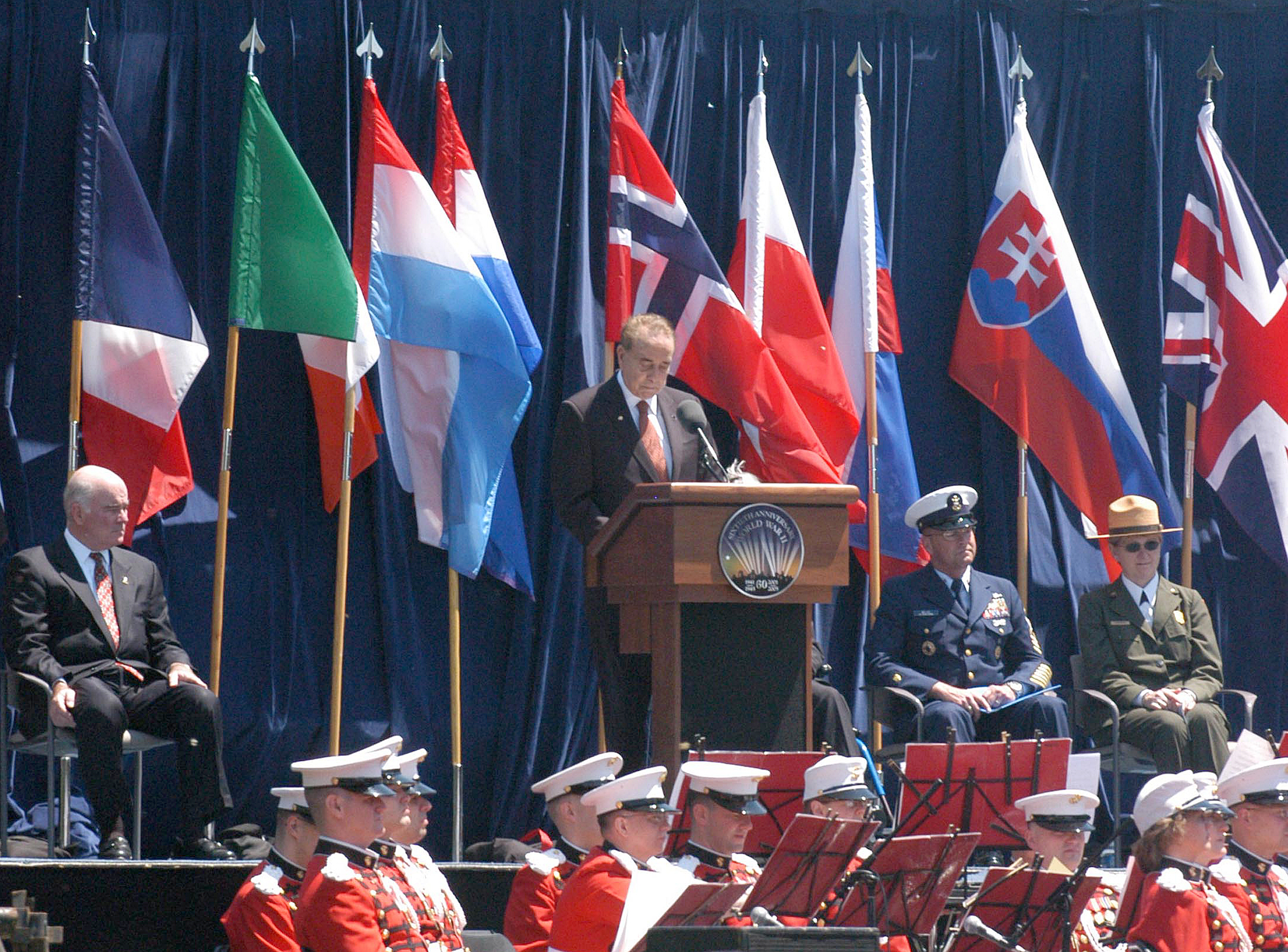
Dole speaking at the 60th Anniversary of VE Day, 2005

=== Political activities ===
After the Clinton–Lewinsky scandal broke in 1998, Dole urged his party to practice "restraint" in their reaction to the scandal. After the resulting late-1998 Impeachment of President Clinton, Dole proposed that, instead of holding an impeachment trial, the Senate instead censure Clinton and then have Clinton sign the censure himself in the presence of congressional leaders, the Vice President, Cabinet members, and the justices of the Supreme Court. Some Democratic senators came to support the notion of having a censure motion instead of holding an impeachment trial. However, the Republican-controlled Senate instead held an impeachment trial in which Clinton was acquitted.

President George W. Bush appointed Dole and Donna Shalala, former United States Secretary of Health and Human Services, as co-chairs of the commission to investigate problems at Walter Reed Army Medical Center in 2007. That same year, Dole joined fellow former U.S. Senate majority leaders Howard Baker from Tennessee, Tom Daschle from South Dakota, and George J. Mitchell from Maine to found the Bipartisan Policy Center, a non-profit think-tank that works to develop policies suitable for bipartisan support. Dole also served as a director for the Asia Universal Bank, a bank domiciled in Kyrgyzstan during the discredited Kurmanbek Bakiyev presidential regime which was subsequently shut down owing to its involvement in money laundering.

Dole issued a letter critical of Newt Gingrich, focusing on Dole and Gingrich's time working together on Capitol Hill, on January 26, 2012. The letter was issued immediately before the 2012 Florida primary. Dole endorsed Mitt Romney for the Republican nomination. Dole cited the association made between himself and Gingrich as fellow Congressional leaders in Democratic advertisements as a key factor for his 1996 presidential defeat.

Dole appeared on the Senate floor to advocate ratification of the Convention on the Rights of Persons with Disabilities on December 4, 2012. Democratic U.S. Senate member John Kerry of Massachusetts explained: "Bob Dole is here because he wants to know that other countries will come to treat the disabled as we do." The Senate rejected the treaty by a vote of 61–38, less than the 66 required for ratification. Many Republican senators voted against the bill, fearing it would interfere with American sovereignty. Dole began a reunion tour of his home state of Kansas in early 2014, seeking to visit each of the state's 105 counties. At each stop he spent approximately an hour speaking with old friends and well-wishers. Dole endorsed and campaigned for incumbent Kansas Senator Pat Roberts during the latter's 2014 re-election bid.

In 2015, Dole endorsed former Florida governor Jeb Bush in his presidential campaign. After Bush ended his campaign following the South Carolina primary, Dole endorsed Florida senator Marco Rubio's campaign. During the campaign, Dole criticized Texas senator Ted Cruz, stating that he "question[ed] his allegiance to the party" and that there would be "wholesale losses" if he were to win the Republican nomination. Dole endorsed Donald Trump after the latter clinched the Republican nomination, while all other then-living Republican presidential nominees, George H. W. Bush, George W. Bush, John McCain, and Mitt Romney refused to do so, and became the lone former nominee to attend the 2016 Republican National Convention. Dole had attended every GOP convention since 1964, and did not consider skipping the 2016 edition even though Trump's politics were closer to that of Dole's 1996 primary rival Pat Buchanan.

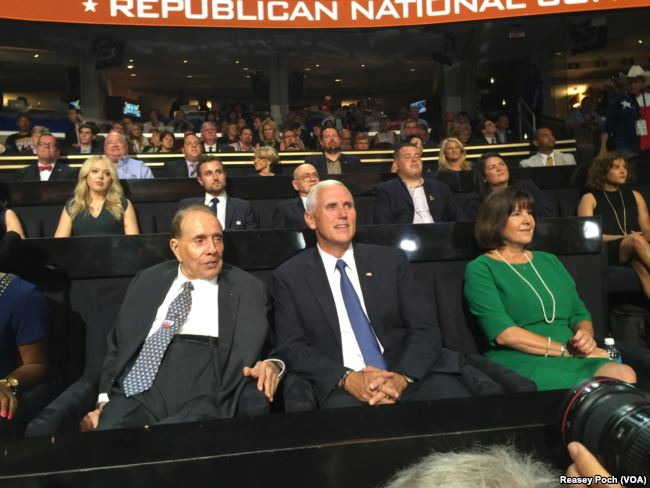
Dole sits with Mike Pence and Karen Pence at the 2016 Republican National Convention.

Former Dole advisers, including Paul Manafort, played a major role in Trump's presidential campaign. Following Trump's electoral victory, Dole coordinated with the Trump campaign and presidential transition team to set up a series of meetings between Trump's staff and Taiwanese officials as well as assisting in successful efforts to include favorable language towards Taiwan in the 2016 Republican Party platform. In February 2016 Dole donated $20,000 to help pay for a camp for children with cancer in central Kansas.

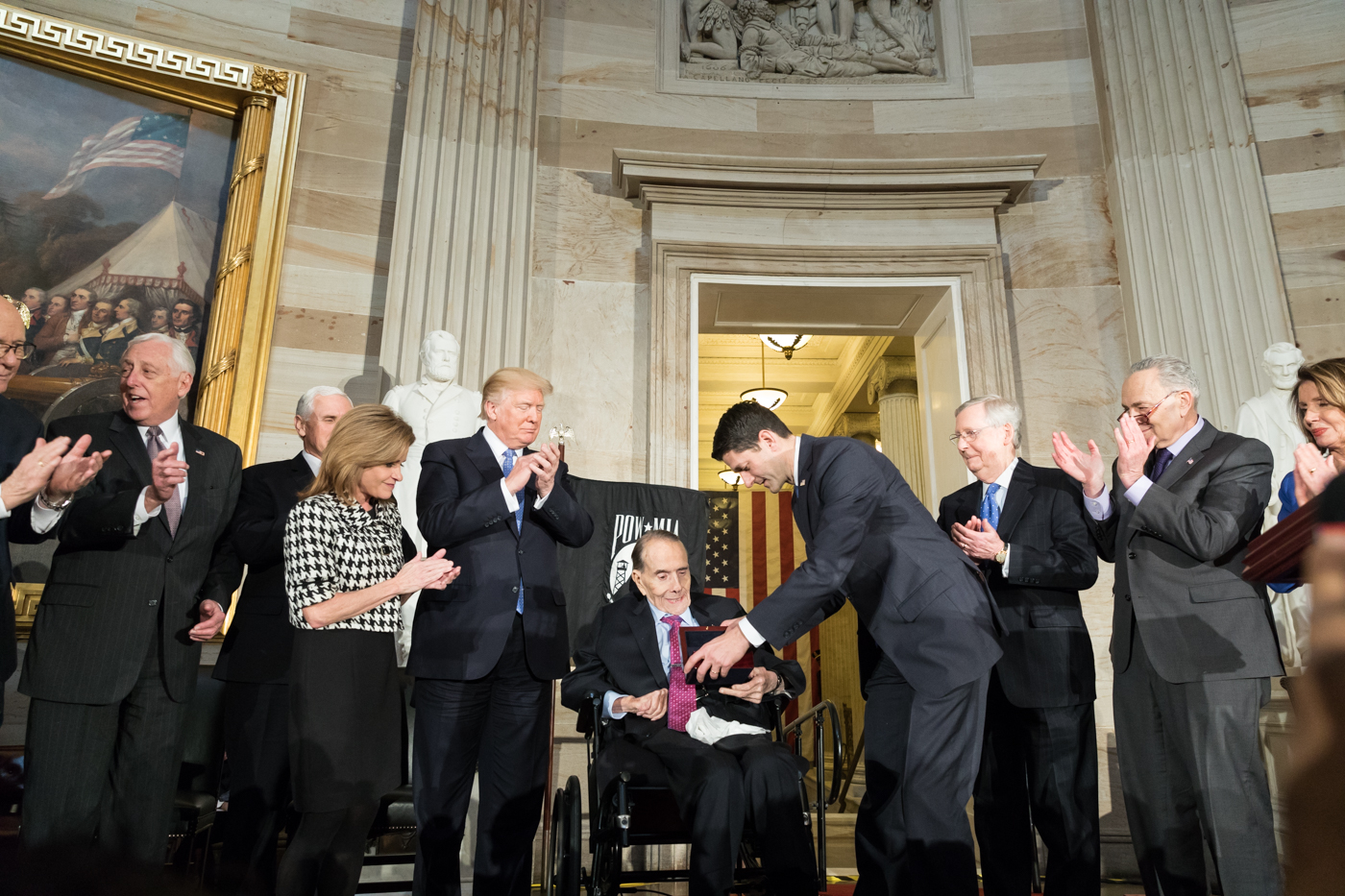
Dole is presented with the Congressional Gold Medal, January 2018

Dole was awarded the Congressional Gold Medal for his service to the nation as a "soldier, legislator and statesman" in January 2018. Despite being immobile, Dole signaled to an aide to assist him in standing for the U.S. national anthem prior to the ceremony.

Dole, at age 95 and in a wheelchair, stood up with the help of an aide at the state funeral of George H. W. Bush in the United States Capitol rotunda on December 4, 2018, and saluted to pay his respects to the late president and fellow World War II veteran.

Dole expressed concern the Commission on Presidential Debates were biased against President Trump and his reelection campaign in a public statement on October 9, 2020, saying how he knew all the Republicans on the commission and feared that "none of them support[ed]" the president.

While he endorsed Trump in both 2016 and 2020, in an interview with USA Today conducted for his 98th birthday, Dole said he was "Trumped out", and that Trump had lost the 2020 election despite his attempts to overturn the 2020 U.S. presidential election. He further stated, "He lost the election, and I regret that he did, but they did", adding that Trump "had Rudy Giuliani running all over the country, claiming fraud. He never had one bit of fraud in all those lawsuits he filed and statements he made." At one point during the conversation Dole said, "I'm a Trumper", and added at another, "I'm sort of Trumped out, though."

== Awards ==
Dole was presented with the Presidential Citizens Medal by President Ronald Reagan on January 18, 1989.

Senator Dole was presented the Presidential Medal of Freedom by President Bill Clinton on January 17, 1997, for service to his country in the military and in his political career. In his acceptance remarks in the East Room of the White House, Dole remarked "I had a dream that I would be here this historic week receiving something from the president — but I thought it would be the front-door key".

Dole received the U.S. Senator John Heinz Award for Greatest Public Service by an Elected or Appointed Official, an award given out annually by Jefferson Awards, in 1997.

Dole received the American Patriot Award from the National Defense University in 2004 for his lifelong dedication to the United States and his service in World War II.

On September 30, 2015, the National Commemoration of the Armenian Genocide Centennial (NCAGC) honored Senator Dole with the organization's Survivor's Gratitude Award in the category of "Hero of Responsibility and Principle" for his tireless efforts in raising attention to the Armenian genocide and its victims.

For his lobbying efforts on behalf of Kosovo Albanians before, during, and after the Kosovo War, Albanian President Bujar Nishani awarded Dole Albania's highest civilian honor, the National Flag Decoration medal, at a May 2017 ceremony in Washington, D.C.

Dole was awarded the Congressional Gold Medal for his service to the nation as a "soldier, legislator and statesman" on January 17, 2018.

The U.S. Congress unanimously passed a bill promoting the 95-year-old Dole from captain to colonel for his service during World War II in 2019. "I've had a great life and this is sort of icing on the cake. It's not that I have to be a colonel; I was happy being a captain and it pays the same," Dole said, jokingly.

== Personal life ==
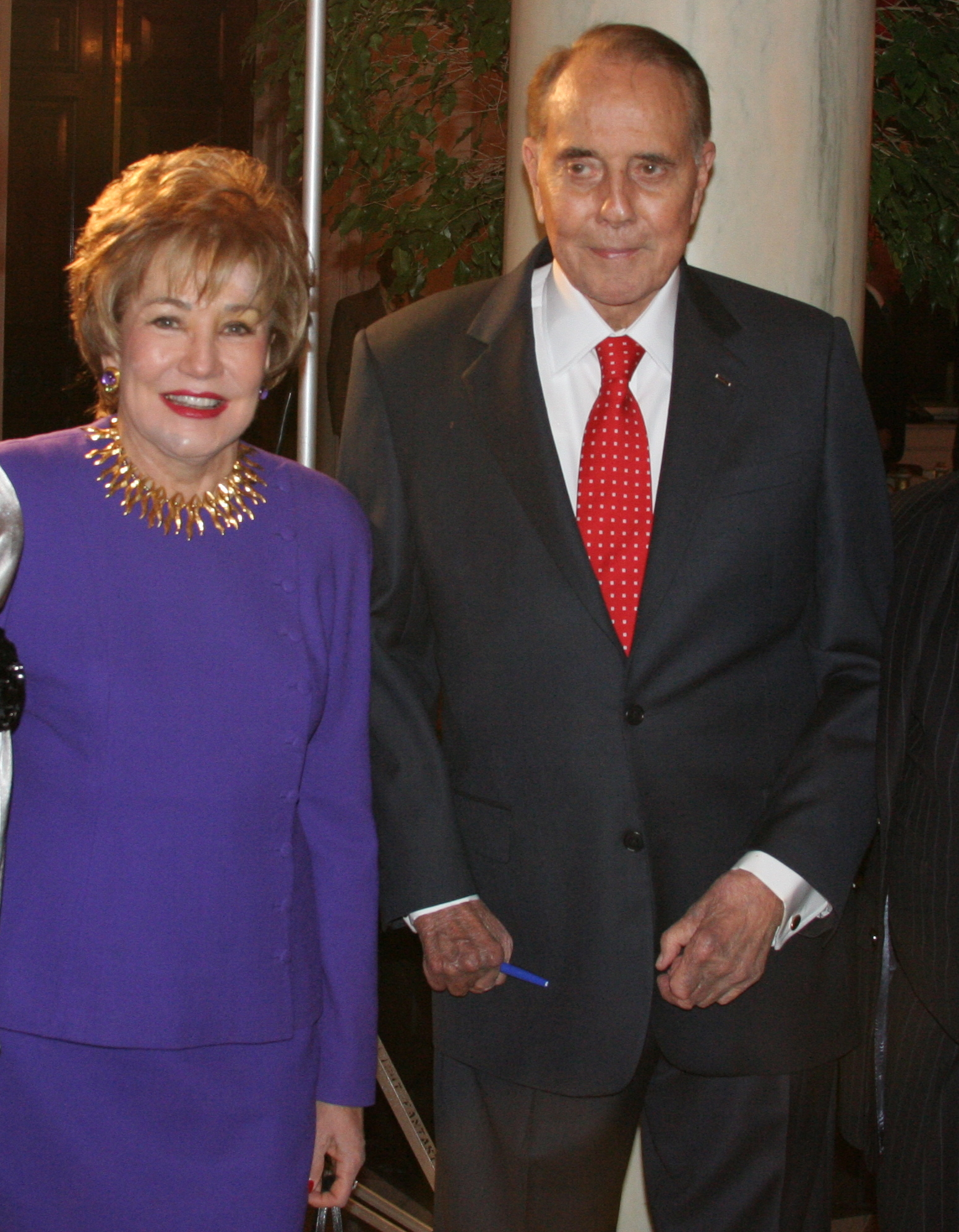
Dole in 2009 with his wife, former cabinet secretary and U.S. Senator Elizabeth Dole

Dole married Phyllis Holden, an occupational therapist at a veterans hospital, in Battle Creek, Michigan, in 1948, three months after they met. They had one daughter. Dole and Holden divorced on January 11, 1972.

Also in 1972, Dole met his second wife, Elizabeth, and they married three years later, on December 6, 1975.

Dole was a Freemason and a member of Russell Lodge No. 177, Russell, Kansas. In 1975, Dole was elevated to the 33rd degree of the Scottish Rite.

Dole was raised Methodist. For years, he and his wife regularly worshipped at Foundry United Methodist Church but left in 1995 due to the more-liberal leanings of its pastor, J. Philip Wogaman, as well as attendance by the Clinton family at services. They subsequently began attending the National Presbyterian Church. However, Dole was largely private about his personal religious views.

Dole often referred to himself in the third person in conversation. In a 1996 appearance on Saturday Night Live, he jokingly refuted the habit to Norm Macdonald, saying: "That's not something Bob Dole does. That's not something Bob Dole has ever done, or that Bob Dole will ever do." He had no relation to the Dole plc or its namesake James Dole, although confusion between the two did lead Burhanettin Ozfatura, mayor of İzmir, Turkey, to ban the sale of Dole bananas in the city in February 1995.

== Health ==
Dole had surgery for prostate cancer in 1991. He later spoke before Congress and on public service announcements about early detection of the disease and the erectile dysfunction that resulted from his surgery. He then became a paid spokesman for Viagra. He also starred in a parody of his Viagra commercials for "the little blue can" of Pepsi.

In 2001, Dole, at age 77, was treated successfully for an abdominal aortic aneurysm by vascular surgeon Kenneth Ouriel.

Dole underwent a hip replacement operation that required him to receive blood thinners in December 2004. One month after the surgery, doctors determined that he was bleeding inside his head. He spent 40 days at Walter Reed Army Medical Center; upon his release, his stronger left arm was of limited use. Dole told a reporter that he needed help to handle the simplest of tasks, since both of his arms were of limited use. He continued to go to Walter Reed several times a week for occupational therapy for his left shoulder.

In 2009, Dole was hospitalized for an elevated heart rate and sore legs for which he underwent a successful skin grafting procedure. He was hospitalized with pneumonia in February 2010 after undergoing knee surgery. Dole spent ten months at Walter Reed Army Medical Center recovering from the surgery and experienced three bouts with pneumonia. He was released from the hospital in November 2010. Dole was readmitted to Walter Reed Army Medical Center in January 2011 and spent about six days there being treated for a fever and a minor infection.

Dole was hospitalized in November 2012 at Walter Reed National Military Medical Center, according to then-Senate Majority Leader Harry Reid. Dole was hospitalized at Walter Reed National Military Medical Center for hypotension on September 13, 2017. He stayed for 24 hours before returning home.

== Death and funeral ==
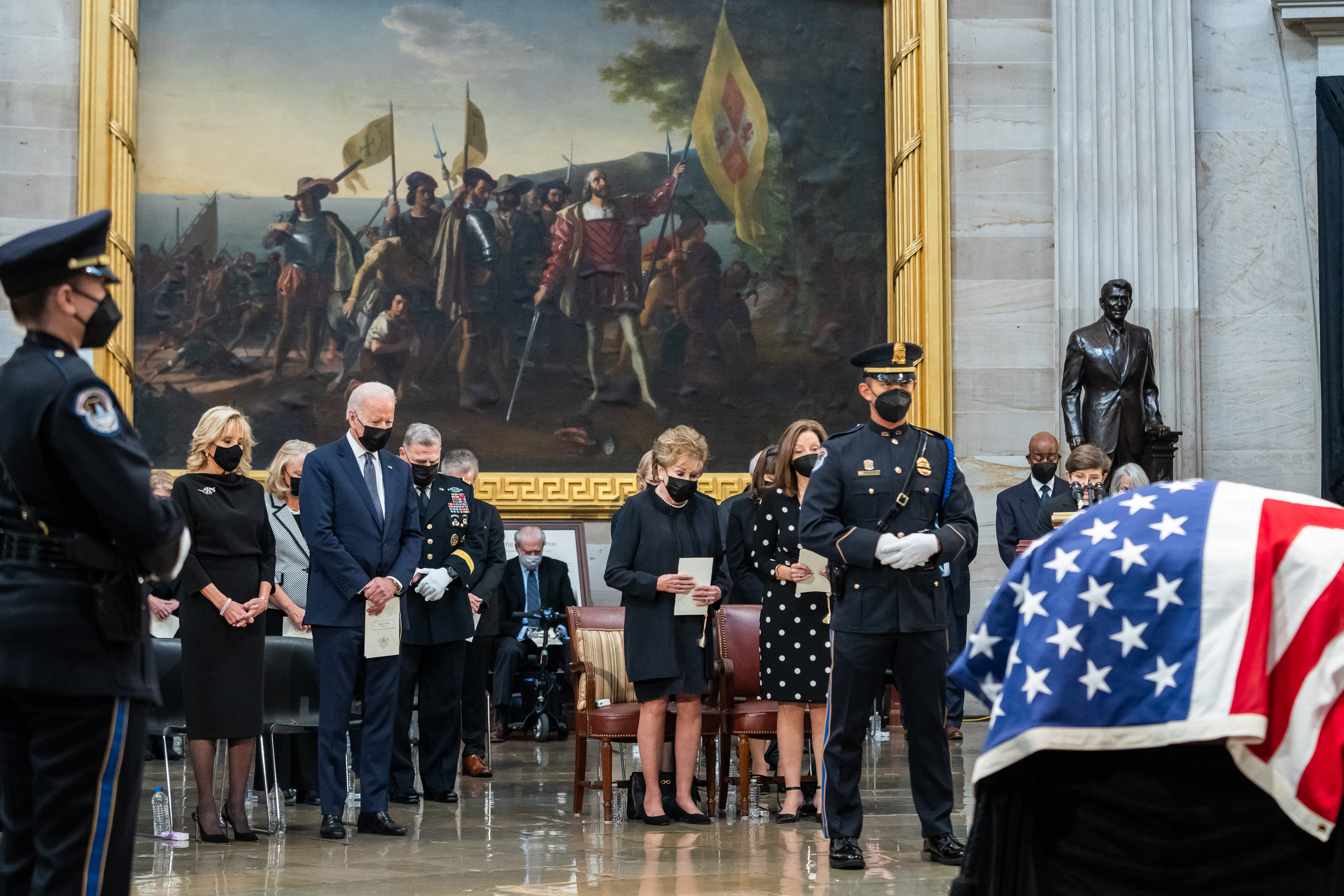
President Biden and Congressional leaders pay respect to the late Bob Dole as his casket lies in state in the United States Capitol rotunda (December 9, 2021)

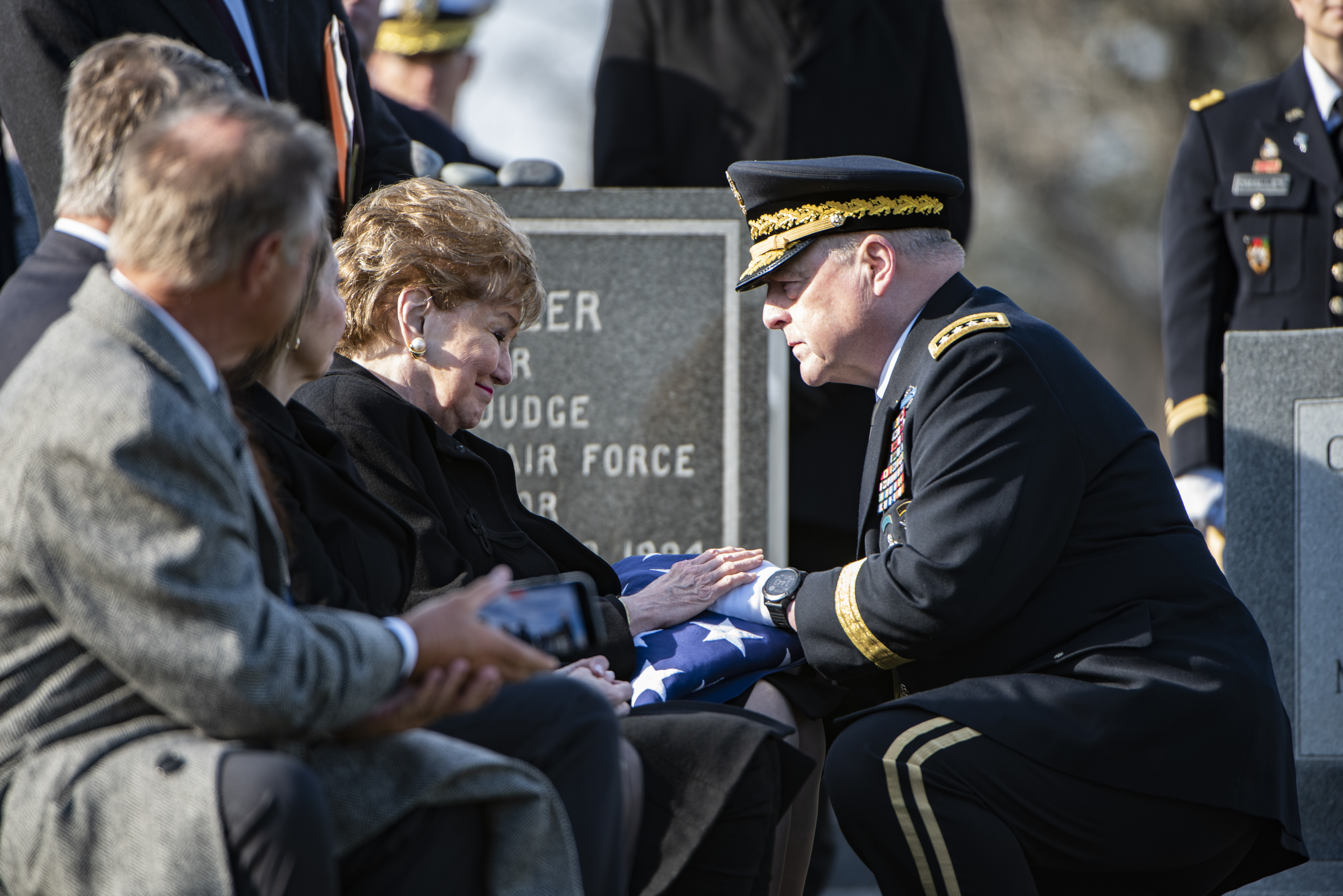
Mark Milley, Chairman of the Joint Chiefs of Staff, presented the U.S. flag for Dole's funeral service at Arlington National Cemetery to Dole's spouse, former Sen. Elizabeth Dole (February 2, 2022)

In February 2021, Dole announced that he had been diagnosed with stage four lung cancer and subsequently underwent immunotherapy, forgoing chemotherapy due to its negative effect on his body. He died of complications from the disease in his sleep at his home in Washington, D.C., on the morning of December 5, 2021, at age 98.

Numerous politicians paid tribute to Dole after his death, including President Joe Biden and former presidents Jimmy Carter, Bill Clinton, George W. Bush, Barack Obama, and Donald Trump. President Biden issued an order for flags to be flown at half-staff through December 11, 2021, with Speaker of the United States House of Representatives Nancy Pelosi and Majority Leader of the United States Senate Chuck Schumer announcing that Dole would lie in state at the U.S. Capitol on December 9.

A funeral service was held at Washington National Cathedral on December 10, 2021, attended by President Biden with First Lady Jill Biden, Vice President Kamala Harris with her husband, second gentleman Doug Emhoff, former president and opponent in the 1996 election Bill Clinton, former vice presidents Mike Pence from Indiana, Dick Cheney from Wyoming, and Dan Quayle from Indiana, Minority Leader of the United States Senate Mitch McConnell from Kentucky, and former U.S. Senate members Pat Roberts and Tom Daschle, among others. Later that same day, a memorial ceremony was held at the National World War II Memorial, where Chairman of the Joint Chiefs of Staff General Mark Milley, actor Tom Hanks, and Today Show co-anchor Savannah Guthrie were among those who spoke.

Dole's casket was then returned to Kansas where a memorial service was held at the Catholic Church in his boyhood home of Russell on December 11. The service was open to the public. Speakers included Governor of Kansas Laura Kelly, U.S. Senate members Jerry Moran and Roger Marshall and former U.S. Senate member Pat Roberts. His casket then went to lie in repose at the Kansas State Capitol. Following that, the casket was returned to Washington and Dole was interred at Arlington National Cemetery.

== Books ==
- Dole, Bob; Elizabeth Dole; Richard Norton Smith (1988). The Doles: Unlimited Partners. Simon & Schuster. ISBN 0-671-60202-0. The book was first released during Bob Dole's 1988 presidential run. Re-released as Unlimited Partners: Our American Story. Simon & Schuster, 1996. ISBN 0-684-83401-4.
- Dole, Bob; Jack Kemp (1996). Trusting the People: The Dole-Kemp Plan to Free the Economy and Create a Better America. HarperCollins. ISBN 0-06-101153-3.
- Dole, Bob (1998). Great Political Wit: Laughing (Almost) All the Way to the White House. Doubleday. ISBN 0-38-549347-9.
- — (2001). Great Presidential Wit: A Collection of Humorous Anecdotes and Quotations. Charles Scribner's Sons. ISBN 0-74-320392-5.
- — (2005). One Soldier's Story: A Memoir. HarperCollins. ISBN 0-06-076341-8.

== Honorary degrees ==
Dole was awarded several honorary degrees. These include:

Location	Date	School	Degree
Kansas	September 27, 1969	Washburn University	Doctor of Laws (LL.D)
Kansas	May 18, 1985	Washburn University	Doctor of Civil Laws (D.C.L.)
Kansas	December 13, 1986	University of Kansas	Doctorate
District of Columbia	1996	Gallaudet University	Doctorate
Kansas	December 14, 2011	University of Kansas	Doctor of Laws (LL.D)
New Hampshire	June 25, 2014	University of New Hampshire	Doctorate
Vermont	June 25, 2015	Norwich University	Doctor of Public Administration (D.P.A.)
Kansas	May 13, 2016	Fort Hays State University	Doctor of Arts (D.Arts)

== See also ==
- Kemp Commission
- List of Freemasons
- List of members of the American Legion
- List of people from Kansas

== General and cited references ==
U.S. House of Representatives
Preceded by Wint Smith	Member of the U.S. House of Representatives from Kansas's 6th congressional district 1961–1963	Constituency abolished
Preceded by William H. Avery	Member of the U.S. House of Representatives from Kansas's 1st congressional district 1963–1969	Succeeded by Keith Sebelius
Party political offices
Preceded by Frank Carlson	Republican nominee for U.S. Senator from Kansas (Class 3); 1968, 1974, 1980, 1986, 1992	Succeeded by Sam Brownback
Preceded by Rogers Morton	Chair of the Republican National Committee; 1971–1973	Succeeded by George H. W. Bush
Preceded by Spiro Agnew	Republican nominee for Vice President of the United States; 1976	Succeeded by George H. W. Bush
Preceded by Howard Baker	Senate Republican Leader; 1985–1996	Succeeded by Trent Lott
Preceded by Robert H. Michel	Response to the State of the Union address 1994	Succeeded by Christine Todd Whitman
Preceded by Christine Todd Whitman	Response to the State of the Union address 1996	Succeeded by J. C. Watts
Preceded by George H. W. Bush	Republican nominee for President of the United States; 1996	Succeeded by George W. Bush
U.S. Senate
Preceded by Frank Carlson	United States Senator (Class 3) from Kansas; 1969–1996; Served alongside: James B. Pearson, Nancy Kassebaum	Succeeded by Sheila Frahm
Preceded by Carl Curtis	Ranking Member of the Senate Agriculture Committee; 1975–1979	Succeeded by Jesse Helms
Preceded by Carl Curtis	Ranking Member of the Senate Finance Committee; 1979–1981	Succeeded by Harry F. Byrd Jr.
Preceded by Russell B. Long	Chair of the Senate Finance Committee; 1981–1985	Succeeded by Bob Packwood
Preceded by Howard Baker	Senate Majority Leader; 1985–1987	Succeeded by Robert Byrd
Preceded by Robert Byrd	Senate Minority Leader; 1987–1995	Succeeded by Tom Daschle
Preceded by George J. Mitchell	Senate Majority Leader; 1995–1996	Succeeded by Trent Lott
Awards
Preceded by Billy Payne	Recipient of the Theodore Roosevelt Award; 1998	Succeeded by Bill Richardson
Honorary titles
Preceded by Neal Smith	Oldest living United States representative Sitting or Former; 2021	Succeeded by Al Quie
Preceded by Billy Evans	Persons who have lain in state or honor in the United States Capitol rotunda December 9, 2021	Succeeded by Harry Reid
