= Zmaj =

Zmaj may refer to:

== Culture ==
- Zmaj (Slavic mythology), a mythological dragon

== People ==
- Jovan Jovanović Zmaj, Serbian poet
- Zmaj od Avale: Vasa Čarapić, Serbian revolutionary
- Zmaj od Noćaja: Stojan Čupić, Serbian revolutionary
- Zmaj od Radana: Ivan Kosančić, Serbian knight
- Zmaj ognjeni Vuk: Vuk Grgurević, Serbian despot
- Zmaj vratnički: Milan Ogrizović, Croatian author

== Companies and organizations ==
- Zmaj aircraft, Yugoslav aircraft manufacturer
- IPM Zmaj, Serbian company

== Places ==
- Kolonija Zmaj, Belgrade

== Sport ==
- HNK Zmaj Makarska, Croatia
- BŠK Zmaj, Croatia

== Other uses ==
- Zmaj (album)
- Yugoslav minelayer Zmaj

== See also ==
- Zmaj od Noćaja (album)
- Zmaj Children Games
