= Nervous system tumor =

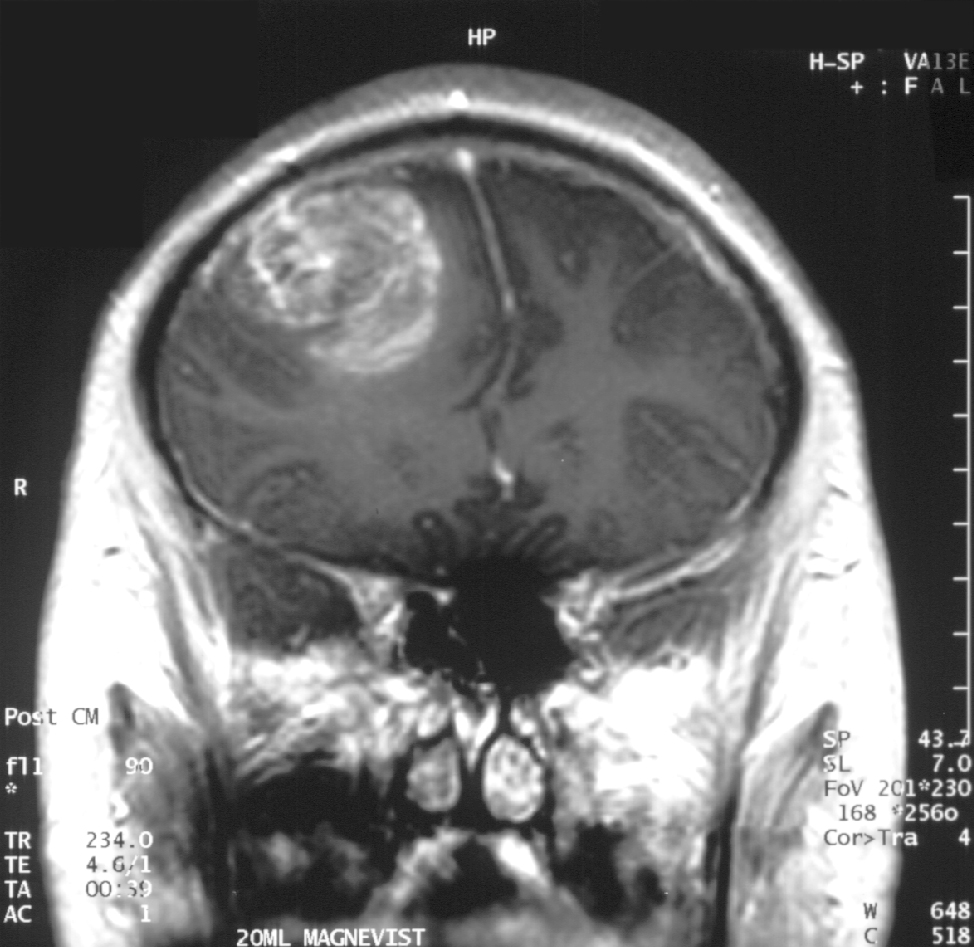
- MRI scan showing a glioblastoma with contrast enhancement
- Specialty: Neurosurgery, oncology

A nervous system tumor is a tumor that arises within the nervous system, either the central nervous system (CNS) or the peripheral nervous system (PNS). Nervous system primary tumors include various types of brain tumor and spinal tumors, such as gliomas, and meningiomas (of the CNS), and schwannomas (of the PNS) and can be either benign or malignant.

There are over 120 types of brain and spinal cord tumors. In the CNS a tumor may be a malignant secondary tumor having metastasised (spread from a primary site in the body). Secondary tumors are more common in adults.

Treatment and prognosis depend on factors such as the type of tumor, location, and molecular characteristics.

== Types ==
Primary tumors can affect either the peripheral nervous system (PNS) or the central nervous system (CNS). They may be either benign or malignant. A nerve sheath tumor may be found in both the CNS and PNS. There are over 120 types of brain and spinal cord tumor. A secondary tumor may be found in the CNS that has spread from another part of the body.

=== In the CNS ===
Primary tumors in the CNS originate within the brain or spinal cord. Some common types include:

- Gliomas: Tumors arising from glial cells, which support and protect neurons. Subtypes are astrocytomas (from astrocytes), oligodendrogliomas (from oligodendrocytes), and glioblastomas (thought to derive from astrocytes).
- Meningiomas: Tumors that develop in the meninges, the protective membranes covering the brain and spinal cord. These are typically benign and more common in adults.
- Medulloblastomas: Malignant tumors that commonly occur in the cerebellum, most often in children.
- Ependymomas: Tumors that arise from the ependymal cells lining the ventricles of the brain and the central canal of the spinal cord.

=== In the PNS ===
Primary tumors in the PNS originate in the peripheral nerves and nerve sheaths. These tumors are often benign but can sometimes be malignant. Common types of nerve sheath tumors include:

- Schwannomas: Benign tumors arising from Schwann cells, which produce the myelin sheath surrounding peripheral nerves. A common subtype is the vestibular schwannoma (acoustic neuroma). They only extremely rarely become malignant.
- Neurofibromas: Benign tumors that grow on nerves, commonly associated with neurofibromatosis type I (NF1).
- Malignant peripheral nerve sheath tumors (MPNSTs): Rare but aggressive cancers that arise from peripheral nerves or nerve sheath cells.

=== Secondary tumors ===
Secondary tumors in the CNS, or metastatic tumors, occur when cancer cells spread to the brain or spinal cord from a primary tumor in another part of the body. These tumors are more common than primary CNS tumors in adults and often originate from cancers of the lung, breast, skin, kidney, or colon.

== Diagnosis ==
Diagnosis typically begins with a comprehensive medical history, and a neurological examination. The goal of the evaluation is to identify any neurological changes that may suggest the presence of a tumor. The assessment considers factors such as the nature, progression, and duration of the presented symptoms.

Nervous system tumors can have a wide range of presentations, and a clinical evaluation is often followed by neuroimaging to confirm or rule out the presence of a tumor. Further testing, such as a biopsy, may be necessary to determine the tumor type and grade.

=== Imaging ===
Advances in imaging technologies, and molecular diagnostics, have significantly improved the accuracy of diagnoses in the CNS, and made possible effective targeted therapies.

Magnetic resonance imaging (MRI) with contrast is the primary imaging modality for diagnosing brain and spinal cord tumors due to its high-resolution visualization of soft tissues. MRI helps identify the tumor's location, size, and potential impact on surrounding structures. In emergency situations or when MRI is contraindicated, a CT scan can be used as an alternative.

Additional imaging techniques can provide further insights.

- Magnetic resonance spectroscopy (MRS) analyzes the chemical composition of brain tissue to differentiate tumors from non-neoplastic conditions such as infections or demyelinating diseases.
- Positron emission tomography (PET) assesses metabolic activity and can distinguish between tumor recurrence and treatment-related changes.
- Diffusion tensor imaging (DTI) maps white matter tracts and helps plan surgeries to avoid critical brain regions.

=== Biopsy ===
A definitive diagnosis often requires a tissue biopsy. The biopsy can be performed through an open surgical procedure or minimally invasive stereotactic surgery. Histopathological examination determines the tumor type, grade, and molecular characteristics, which are critical for guiding treatment decisions.

In some cases, a liquid biopsy by way of a lumbar puncture (spinal tap) may be performed to analyze cerebrospinal fluid (CSF). This can help detect tumor cells, especially in cases of suspected brain tumor metastasis, or primary CNS lymphoma. The presence of tumor markers or abnormal cells in the CSF can provide diagnostic information that complements imaging and biopsy findings.

Advances in molecular diagnostics allow for the identification of genetic and molecular markers, improving the precision of tumor classification and enabling targeted therapies.

== Epidemiology ==
Nervous system neoplasms vary in incidence and type based on factors such as age, tumor origin, and malignancy. Overall, brain and spinal tumors are more common in females due to the higher prevalence of meningiomas.

Gliomas are the most common malignant brain tumor accounting for approximately 81% of malignant brain tumors and 26% of all brain tumors They are the most common brain tumor in children up to 14 years (25.7%), the next most commonly found are pilocytic astrocytomas (17.5%), and embryonal tumors (15.7%). The overall incidence rate of brain tumors in children is 6.2 per 100,000. Glioblastomas are the most aggressive malignant glioma and make up approximately 47.7% of all gliomas, and are more commonly found in males. Their incidence rate is 3.23 per 100,000 people. The 5-year survival rate for glioblastoma is only 6.8%.

Meningiomas, which develop in the meninges, are common brain tumors, representing approximately 37% of all brain tumors. The incidence rate for meningiomas is 9.51 per 100,000 people. Unlike gliomas, more than 98% of meningiomas are benign. The 5-year survival rate for nonmalignant meningiomas is approximately 91%.

The distribution and behavior of nervous system neoplasms differ significantly between adults and children. Gliomas are more frequent and aggressive in adults, while certain benign tumors like pilocytic astrocytomas are more common in children. Notably, adults are more likely to develop secondary (metastatic) tumors that spread to the nervous system from cancers originating in other parts of the body.

== See also ==
- Neuroendocrine tumor
