= Hypoesthesia =

Partial loss of sensitivity to sensory stimuli

- Other names: Numbness, hypesthesia
- Specialty: Psychiatry, Neurology

Hypoesthesia or numbness is a common side effect of various medical conditions that manifests as a reduced sense of touch or sensation, or a partial loss of sensitivity to sensory stimuli. In everyday speech this is generally referred to as numbness.

Hypoesthesia primarily results from damage to nerves, and from blockages in blood vessels, resulting in ischemic damage to tissues supplied by the blocked blood vessels. This damage is detectable through the use of various imaging studies. Damage in this way is caused by a variety of different illnesses and diseases. A few examples of the most common illnesses and diseases that can cause hypoesthesia as a side effect are as follows:

- Decompression sickness
- Trigeminal schwannoma
- Rhombencephalitis
- Intradural extramedullary tuberculoma of the spinal cord
- Cutaneous sensory disorder
- Beriberi

== Diseases ==
=== Decompression sickness ===
Decompression sickness occurs during rapid ascent, spanning 20 or more feet (typically from underwater). Decompression sickness may express itself in a variety of ways, including hypoesthesia. Hypoesthesia results because of air bubbles that form in blood, which prevents oxygenation of downstream tissue. In cases of decompression sickness, treatment to relieve hypoesthesia symptoms is quick and efficient. Hyperbaric oxygen is used to maintain long term stability, which includes breathing of oxygen at a level of 100%.

=== Trigeminal schwannoma ===
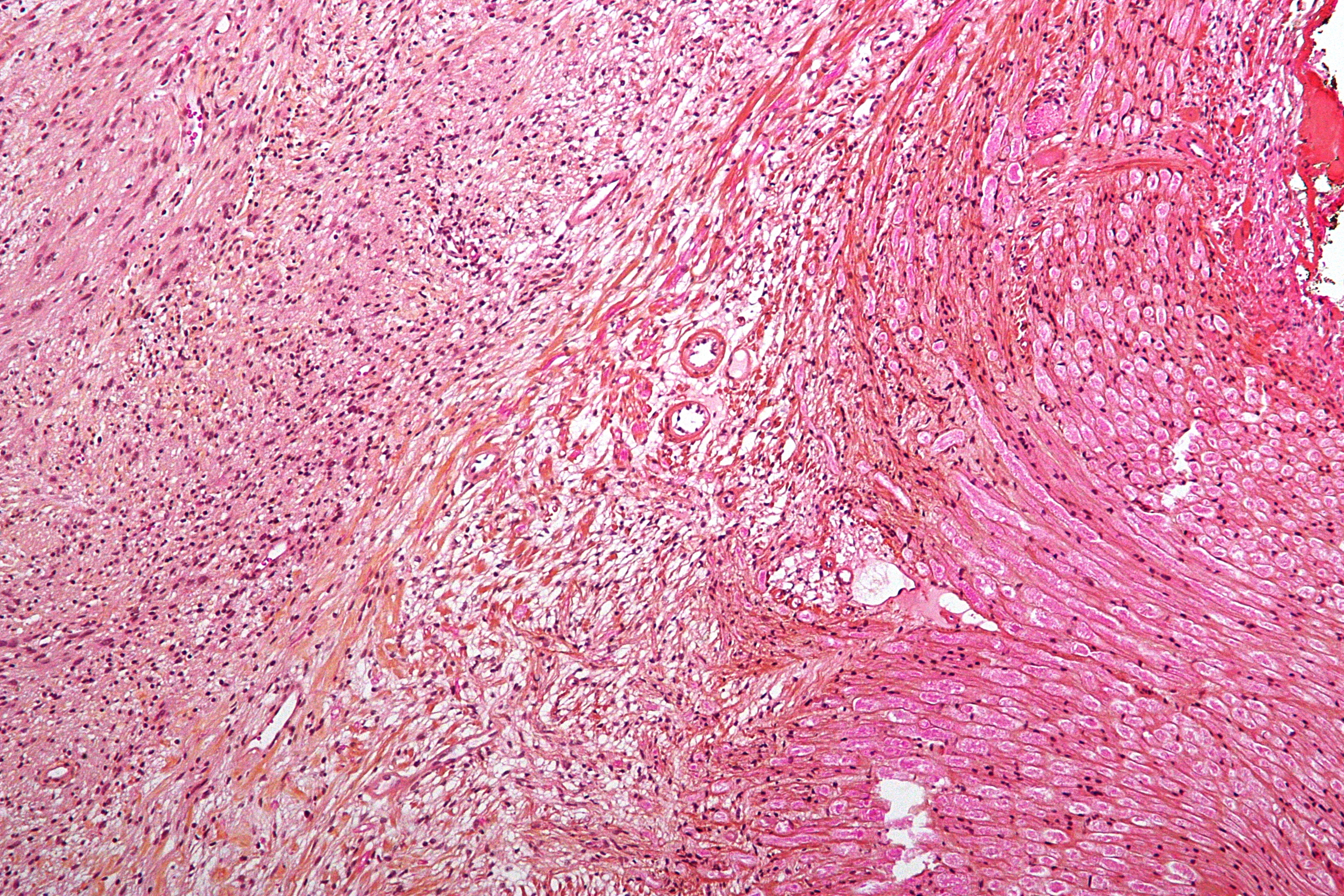
Cell morphology observed in all nerve root schwannomas

Trigeminal schwannoma is a condition in which a tumor forms on the trigeminal nerve (also known as cranial nerve five). This prevents sensation in the area associated with the nerve. In the case of the trigeminal nerve, this is the face, meaning hypoesthesia of the face is experienced. Excision is the only effective treatment of trigeminal schwannoma, though this may not treat the associated hypoesthesia if damage has already occurred. Following surgery, many patients still experienced hypoesthesia and some even experienced increased effects.

=== Rhombencephalitis ===
Rhombencephalitis involves bacterial invasion of the brainstem and trigeminal nerve, and has a wide variety of symptoms that may vary between patients. Similarly to the trigeminal schwanonoma mentioned above, this can result in facial hypoesthesia. Rhombencephalitis may also result in hypoesthesia of the V1 through V3 dermatomes. The main treatment option for this infection is antibiotics, such as ampicillin, to remove the bacteria.

=== Intradural extramedullary tuberculoma of the spinal cord (IETSC) ===
IETSC is a cancer of the spinal cord that involves hypoesthesia of all parts of the body associated with the affected spinal nerves. The inability to convey information from the body to the central nervous system will cause a total lack of feeling in the associated regions.

=== Cutaneous sensory disorder ===
Hypoesthesia is one of the negative sensory symptoms associated with cutaneous sensory disorder (CSD). In this condition, patients have abnormal disagreeable skin sensations that can be due to increased nervous system activity (stinging, itching or burning) or decreased nervous system activity (numbness or hypoesthesia).

=== Beriberi ===
Hypoesthesia originating in (and extending centrally from) the feet, fingers, navel, and/or lips is one of the common symptoms of beriberi, which is a set of symptoms caused by thiamine deficiency.

== Diagnosis ==
A patient experiencing symptoms of hypoesthesia is often asked a series of questions to pinpoint the location and severity of the sensory disruption. A physical examination may follow where a doctor may tap lightly on the skin to determine how much feeling is present. Depending upon the location of the symptoms occurring, a doctor may recommend some tests to determine the overlying cause of the hypoesthesia. These tests include imaging computerized axial tomography (CT) and magnetic resonance imaging (MRI) scans, nerve conduction studies to measure electrical impulses passing through the nerves in search of damage to the nerves, and various reflex tests. An example of a reflex test would be the patellar reflex test.

== Treatment ==
Treatment of hypoesthesia are aimed at targeting the more broad disease or illnesses that has caused the side effect of sensation loss.

== See also ==
- Anaphia
- Dysesthesia
- Hyperesthesia
- Paresthesia
- Raynaud syndrome
