= Verocay body =

Abnormal lesion of the brain, indicating schwannoma

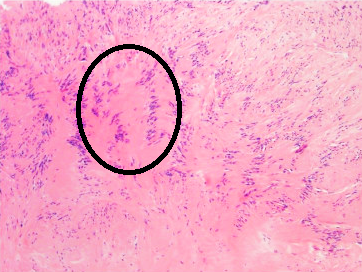
Antoni A area of schwannoma with Verocay bodies (one annotated by circle)

Verocay bodies were first described by Uruguayan neuro-pathologist José Juan Verocay in 1910. It is a required histopathological finding for diagnosing schwannomas (tumors of Schwann cells).

Verocay bodies are a component of "Antoni A" which are the dense areas of schwannomas located between palisading spindle cells found in neoplasms. Two nuclear palisading regions and an anuclear zone make up one Verocay body.

Originally Verocay bodies were called 'neuromas', a term coined by Louis Odier in 1803. The name changed to ‘neuro-fibroma’ under Von Recklinghausen and later in 1935 to ‘neurilemmomas’ under Arthur Purdy Stout. When Harkin and Reed coined the term 'schwannoma' in 1968, Verocay bodies received their present-day name.

Features on histopathological examination include:

1. Eosinophilic acellular area due to overexpression of lamins.

2. Consisting of reduplicated basement membrane and cytoplasmic processes.
