= Nerve sheath tumor =

Nerve sheath tumors
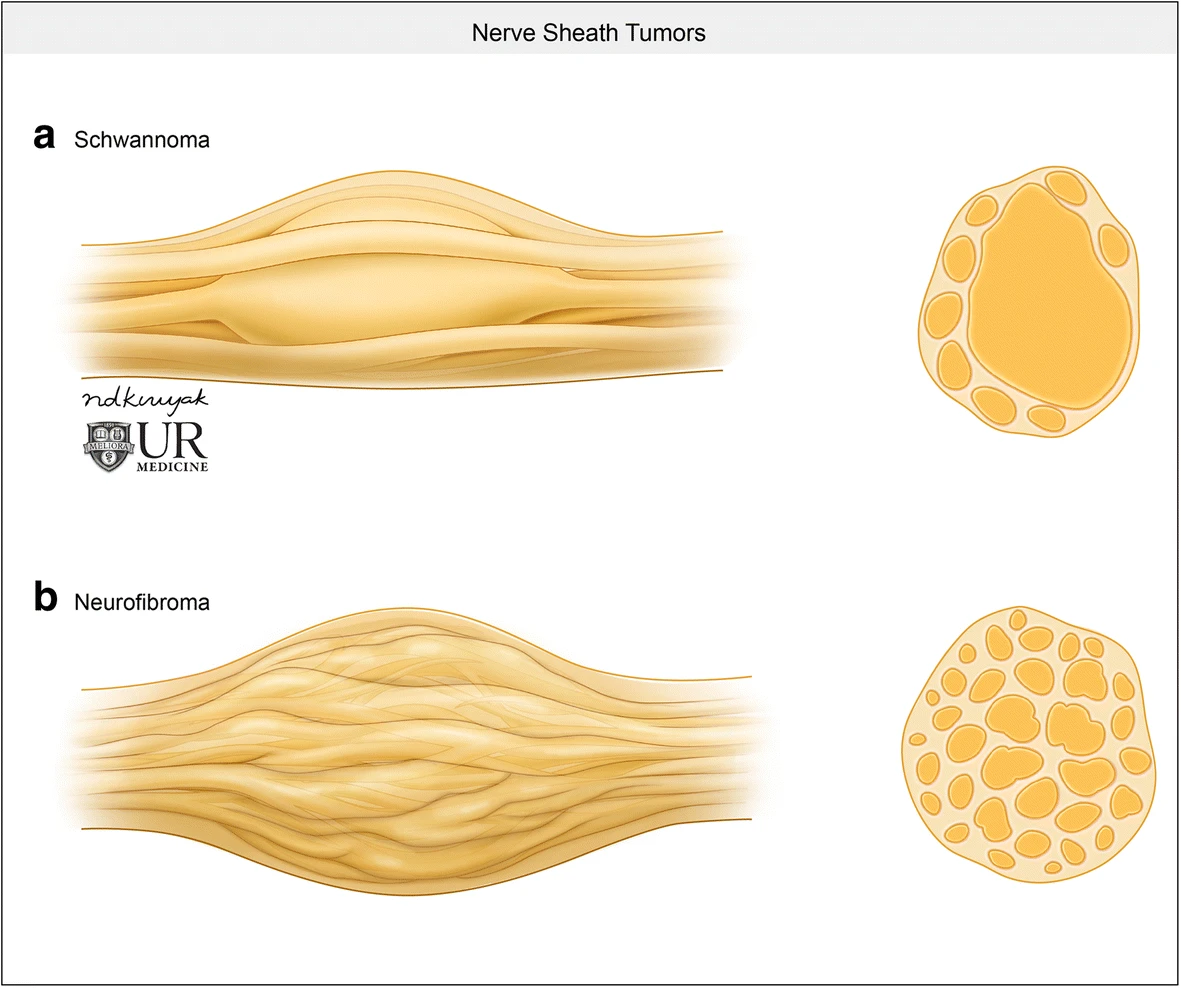
- Illustration of typical Schwannoma (a.) and Neurofibroma (b.) configurations around nerves. Source: Chengazi, H.U., Bhatt, A.A. Pathology of the carotid space. Insights Imaging 10, 21 (2019). https://doi.org/10.1186/s13244-019-0704-z
- Specialty: Neuro-oncology

A nerve sheath tumor is a type of tumor of the nervous system (nervous system neoplasm) which is made up primarily of the myelin surrounding nerves. Nerve sheath tumors can be benign or malignant, and may affect both the peripheral and central nervous systems. There are three main types of nerve sheath tumors: schwannomas, neurofibromas, and malignant peripheral nerve sheath tumors.

== Classification of nerve sheath tumors ==
=== Spinal nerve sheath tumors ===
Spinal nerve sheath tumors are typically intradural, meaning that they arise inside the dura mater surrounding the spinal cord (thecal sac), but may also be found in other areas of the spine. Spinal nerve sheath tumors generally arise as single lesions. Presence of multiple lesions is associated with genetic conditions including neurofibromatosis type 1, neurofibromatosis type 2, and Schwannomatosis.

Most spinal schwannomas are intradural-extramedullary, growing inside the thecal sac, but outside the spinal cord itself. Intradural-intramedullary schwannomas also develop, but tend to be rare.

=== Peripheral nerve sheath tumors ===
A peripheral nerve sheath tumor is a nerve sheath tumor in the peripheral nervous system. Benign peripheral nerve sheath tumors include schwannomas and neurofibromas. A malignant peripheral nerve sheath tumor is a cancerous peripheral nerve sheath tumor, which is frequently resistant to conventional treatments.

== Symptoms ==
Spinal and peripheral nerve sheath tumors may lead to a variety of symptoms depending on tumor type, location, and severity, though they do share some symptoms.

Some common findings for all nerve sheath tumors include:

- Pain
- Numbness
- Tingling
- Burning sensation
- Weakness
- Visible or palpable mass

Many individuals are also asymptomatic.

== Mechanism ==
The primary Schwann cell differentiation and neoplastic proliferations are characteristics of peripheral nerve sheath tumors. For instance, the Schwann cell, which is the major neoplastic cell component of neurofibroma, is cytologically distinguished by the expression of S-100 protein and wavy nuclear outlines. A variety of peripheral nerve cells, including axons, perineurial cells, fibroblasts, and varying inflammatory components such as mast cells and lymphocytes, are also present in neurofibromas. A population of CD34-positive cells with an unknown histogenesis is also found.

== Diagnosis ==
=== Spinal nerve sheath tumors ===
Magnetic resonance imaging (MRI) is typically used in spinal nerve sheath tumor diagnosis. Each nerve sheath tumor type has a few different associated features on MRI imaging. Neurofibromas and malignant peripheral nerve sheath tumors can be difficult to distinguish from each other and may require additional testing, including PET scans (^{18}FDG-PET). Image-guided needle biopsies may be performed if there is concern for malignancy.

=== Peripheral nerve sheath tumors ===
MRI, tissue, and nerve biopsies are also frequently used in diagnosis of peripheral nerve sheath tumors. Computerized tomography (CT) scans, electromyography, and nerve conduction studies are other options.

== Management ==
=== Benign spinal nerve sheath tumors ===
Treatment of spinal nerve sheath tumors typically depends on presence and severity of symptoms. For asymptomatic or incidental schwannomas or neurofibromas, only continued imaging is typically indicated to assess whether tumor growth is occurring. Surgical resection may be an option for tumors causing extensive radicular pain or other symptoms, and for tumors exhibiting aggressive behavior. Plexiform neurofibromas (associated with neurofibromatosis type 1) have a higher risk of transforming into malignant tumors and require individual treatment plans. Surgical resection is the treatment of choice for symptomatic plexiform neurofibromas, though a new drug, selumetinib was approved in 2020, as a systemic therapeutic for inoperable cases in pediatric patients. Stereotactic body radiotherapy (SBRT) is a promising treatment option for benign spinal nerve sheath tumors, though more research is currently needed to determine effectiveness across different tumor types and to establish adequate clinical guidelines.

=== Malignant spinal nerve sheath tumors ===
Complete surgical resection is the current treatment of choice for malignant spinal nerve sheath tumors. Post-surgical radiotherapy has shown some promise in improving recurrence-free survival in intermediate and high grade tumors. Chemotherapy for malignant spinal nerve sheath tumors has shown mixed results and is typically only used in patients in which surgery is not an option, or with aggressive or metastatic disease.

=== Benign peripheral nerve sheath tumors ===
As with spinal nerve sheath tumors, continuous monitoring for asymptomatic, incidental, or slow growing tumors is generally the standard of care for peripheral nerve sheath tumors. Management of symptomatic tumors is also similar to spinal nerve sheath tumors. A complete surgical resection of peripheral tumors is typically done whenever indicated, and if possible. Gamma knife radiosurgery, a subset of SBRT, is an option for peripheral nerve sheath tumors growing near the brain.
