= IIPM (disambiguation) =

The Indian Institute of Planning and Management (IIPM) was an unaccredited institute that was based in New Delhi.

IIPM may also refer to:

- Indian Institute of Personnel Management, an institute focused on human resources management
- International Institute of Political Murder, a theatre and film production company founded by Milo Rau

== See also ==
- IPM (disambiguation)
