= IPMS =

IPMS may refer to:

- Institution of Professionals, Managers and Specialists, a former British trade union
- International Plastic Modellers' Society, an international organisation of plastic model-building hobbyists
- International Property Measurement Standards Coalition (IPMSC), a group of organisations working to develop and implement international standards for measuring property
