= Anaphia =

- Differential diagnosis: spinal cord injury

Anaphia, also known as tactile anesthesia, is a medical symptom in which there is a total or partial absence of the sense of touch. Anaphia is a common symptom of spinal cord injury and neuropathy.

== See also ==
- Dysesthesia
- Hyperesthesia
- Hypoesthesia
