= Intranodal palisaded myofibroblastoma =

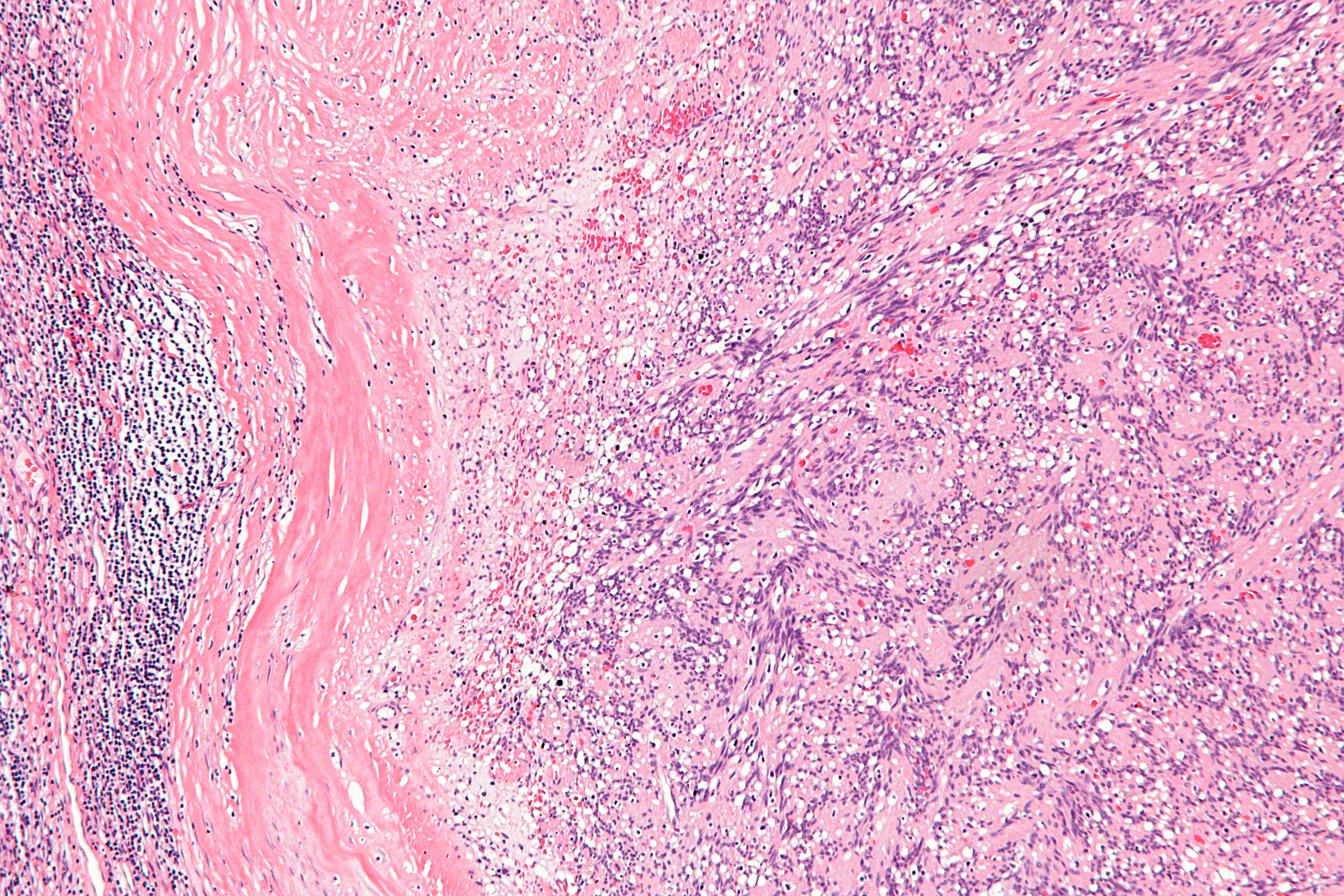
- Micrograph of an intranodal palisaded myofibroblastoma. H&E stain.
- Specialty: Oncology

Intranodal palisaded myofibroblastoma (IPM) is a rare primary tumour of lymph nodes, that classically presents as an inguinal mass.

It afflicts predominantly males of middle age.

== Signs and symptoms ==
IPMs present as painless lymphadenopathy. They usually are found in the inguinal region and grow slowly. The signs and symptoms are non-specific, i.e. it is not possible to diagnose an IPM from the symptoms and manner in which they present. The main (clinical) differential diagnosis of IPM is metastatic cancer, e.g. squamous cell carcinoma, melanoma, adenocarcinoma.

== Diagnosis ==
IPMs are diagnosed by examination of the tissue by a pathologist. They have a rim of peripheral lymphoid tissue (remnant of a lymph node) and consist of spindle cells with nuclear palisading. Red blood cell extravasation is common and blood vessels surrounded by collagen with (fine) peripheral spokes (amianthoid fibers) are usually seen.

Immunostains for smooth muscle actin and cyclin D1 are characteristically positive. The main histologic differential diagnosis is schwannoma.

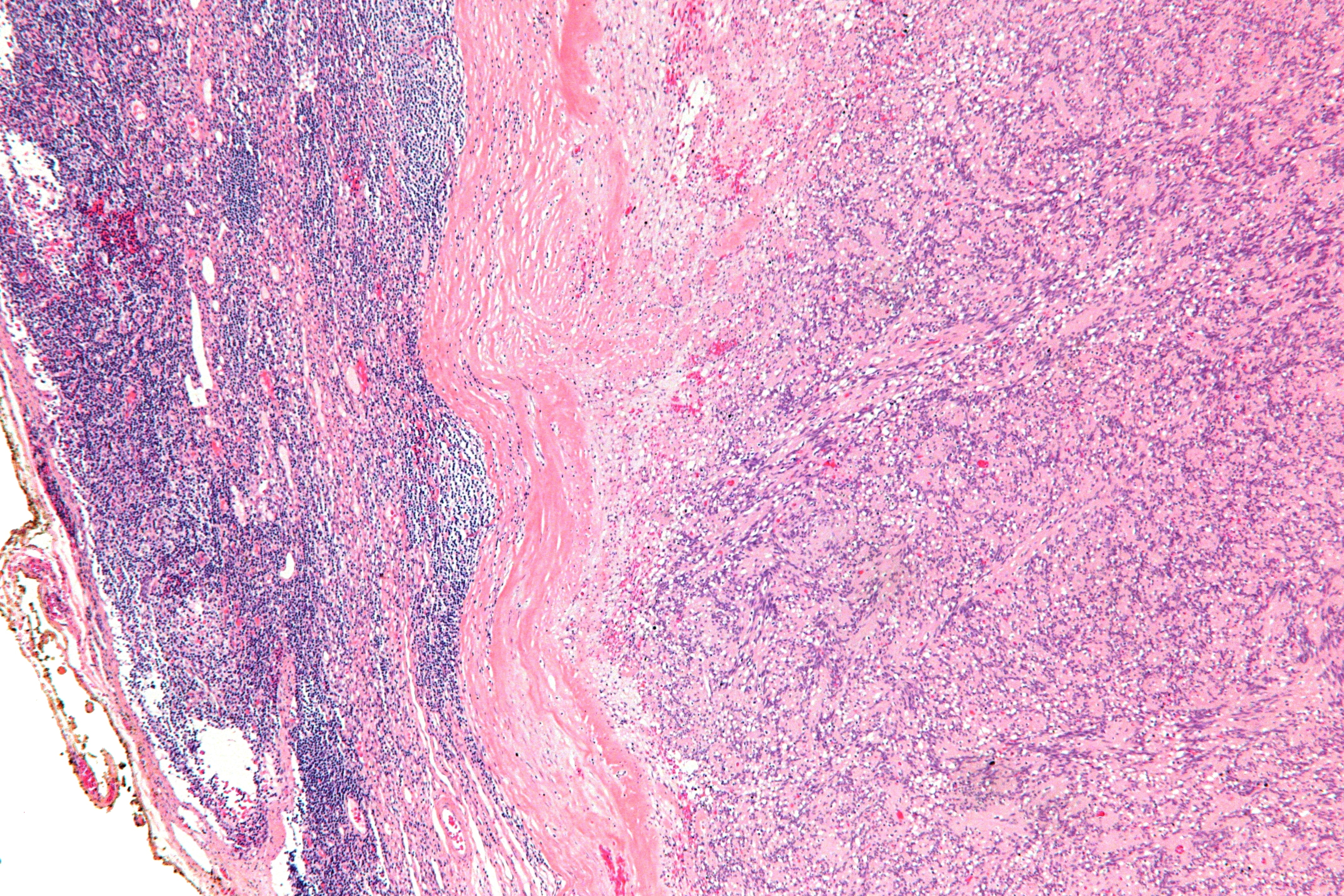
Low mag.

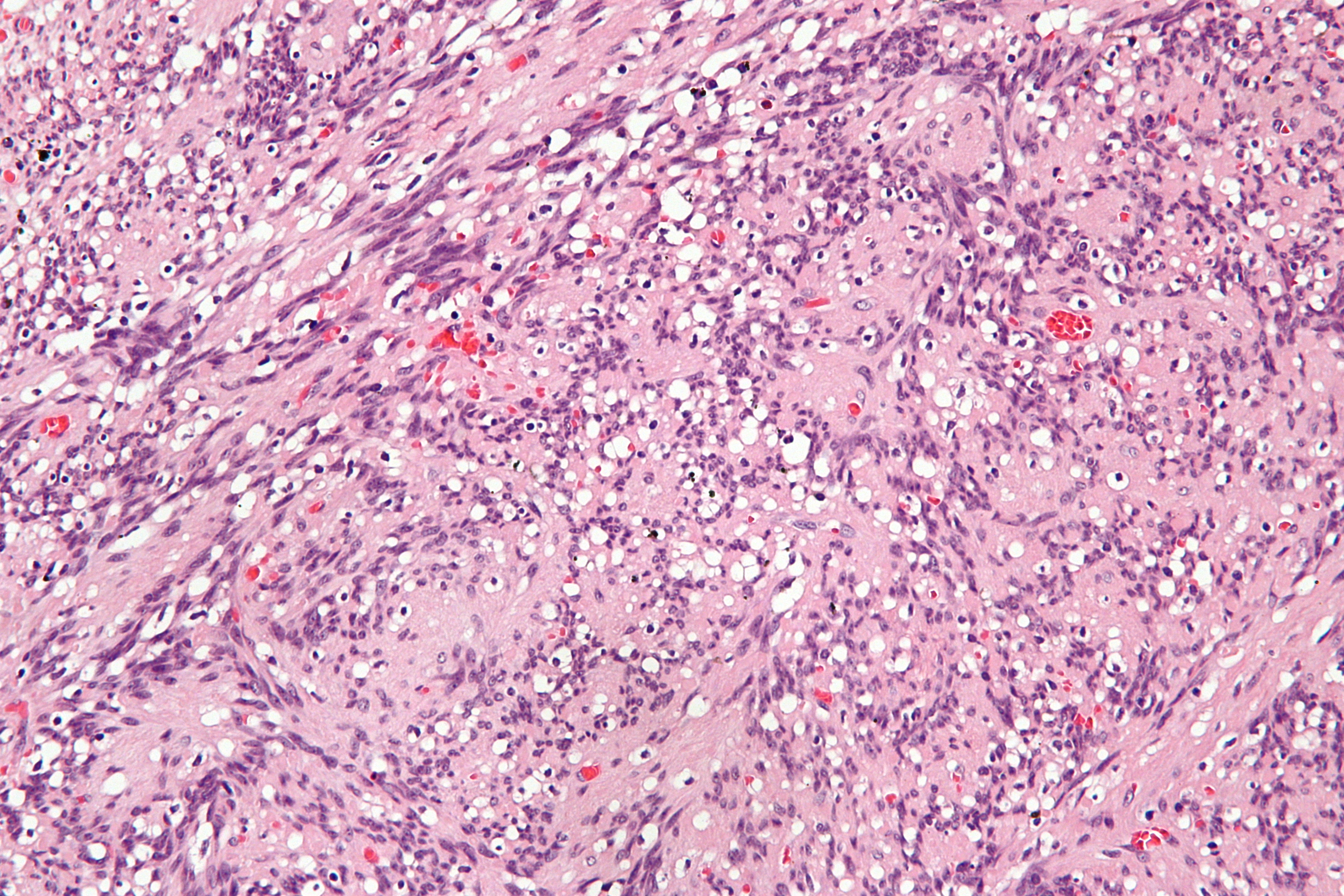
High mag.

== Treatment ==
Simple surgical excision is considered curative. Rare recurrences have been reported.

== See also ==
- Schwannoma
