= Schwannoma =

Benign nerve-sheath tumor composed of Schwann cells

- Other names: neurilemoma, neuroma, neurolemoma, Schwann cell tumor
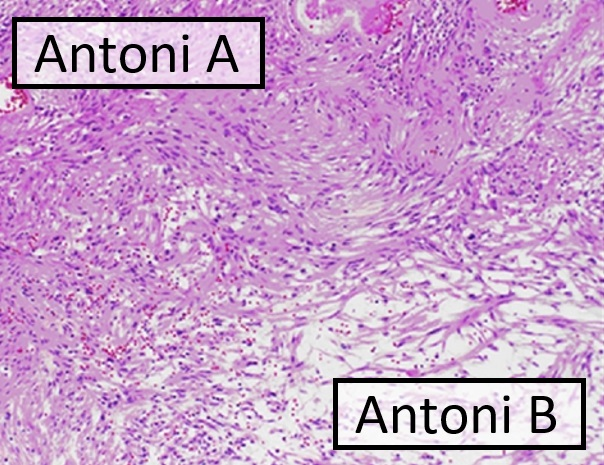
- Micrograph of a schwannoma showing both a cellular Antoni A area (top) and a loose paucicellular Antoni B area (bottom). HE stain.
- Specialty: Neuro-oncology

A schwannoma (or neurilemmoma) is a usually benign nerve sheath tumor comprising Schwann cells, which normally produce the insulating myelin sheath covering peripheral nerves.

Schwannomas are homogeneous tumors, consisting only of Schwann cells. The tumor cells always stay on the outside of the nerve, but the tumor itself may either push the nerve aside and/or up against a bony structure (thereby possibly causing damage). Schwannomas are relatively slow-growing. For reasons not yet understood, schwannomas are mostly benign and less than 1% become malignant, degenerating into a form of cancer known as neurofibrosarcoma. These masses are generally contained within a capsule, so surgical removal is often successful.

Schwannomas can be associated with neurofibromatosis type II, which may be due to a loss-of-function mutation in the protein merlin. They are universally S-100 positive, which is a marker for cells of neural crest cell origin.

Schwannomas of the head and neck are a fairly common occurrence and can be found incidentally in 3–4% of patients at autopsy. Most common of these is a vestibular schwannoma, a tumor of the vestibulocochlear nerve that may lead to tinnitus and hearing loss on the affected side. Outside the cranial nerves, schwannomas may present on the flexor surfaces of the limbs. Rare occurrences of these tumors in the penis have been documented in the literature.

Verocay bodies are seen histologically in schwannomas.

== Variants ==
- Pleural schwannoma is extremely rare. A unique subtype of schwannoma that typically develops in superficial (cutaneous or subcutaneous) sites and may be identified by its development pattern, which is plexiform (intraneuralnodular). The correlation with schwannoma predisposition disorders like NF2 and schwannomatosis, however, is minimal (approximately 5 percent of cases). These tumors might lack a capsule or be less encapsulated than a typical schwannoma.More challenging to identify from MPNST are the infrequent plexiform schwannomas that develop in deep anatomical sites, such as soft tissue or major peripheral nerves. These tumors may exhibit enhanced cellularity and mitotic activity. Although the likelihood of these tumors developing into cancer is extremely low, local recurrence is possible in around half of cases. On MRI, it usually shows hyper or iso-intensity on T1-weighted images and heterogenous hyperintensities on T2 weighted images. Pleural schwannoma typically shows fatty degeneration, hemorrhage, perivascular hyalinization, and cystic formation thus giving heterogenous hyperintensities on T2 weighted images. Complete surgical removal of pleural schwannoma is the usual treatment.
- Cellular schwannoma is a relatively rare variation. Cellular schwannoma is nearly exclusively made up of a fascicular proliferation of well-differentiated Schwann cells that are cytologically bland, missing Verocay bodies, and just slightly exhibiting Antoni B pattern growth (10% of the tumor area). Local recurrence is Variable (5–40%) and perhaps greater than in normal schwannomas.
- Malignant melanotic nerve sheath tumor (previously known as melanotic schwannoma) is a rare aggressive peripheral nerve sheath tumor that typically develops in conjunction with spinal or visceral autonomic nerves, consisting uniformly of Schwann cells displaying melanocytic differentiation.

== Gallery ==
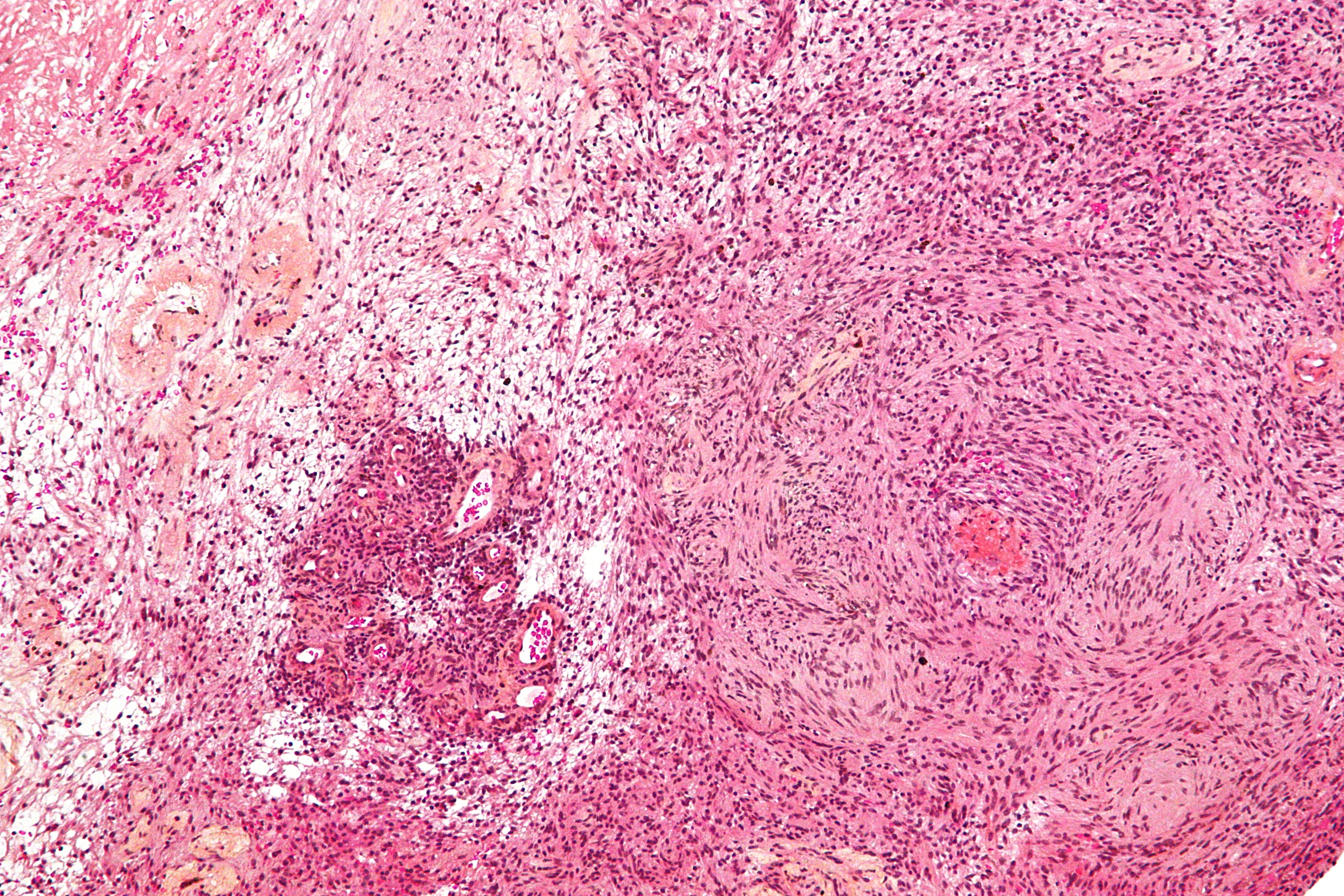

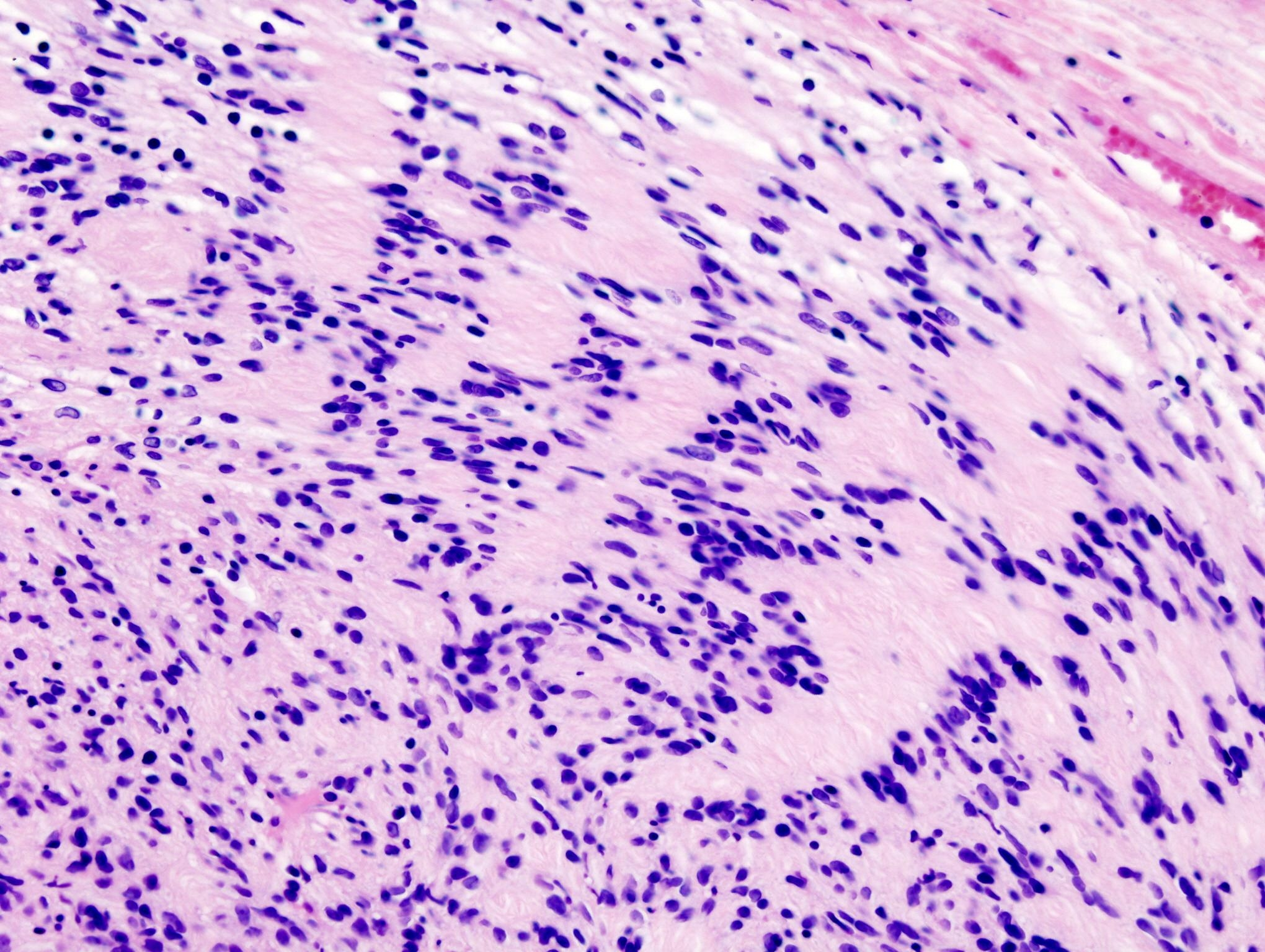

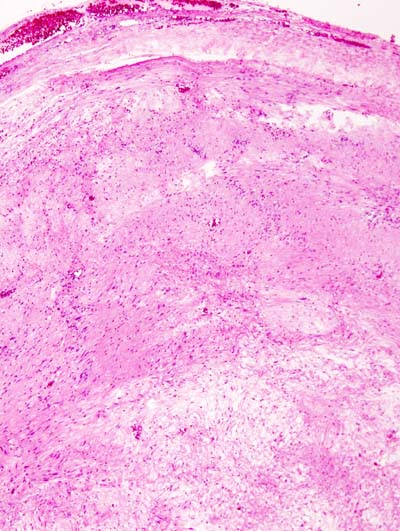
Subcutaneous schwannoma

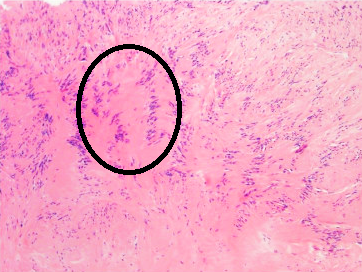
Antoni A area of schwannoma with Verocay bodies (one annotated by circle)

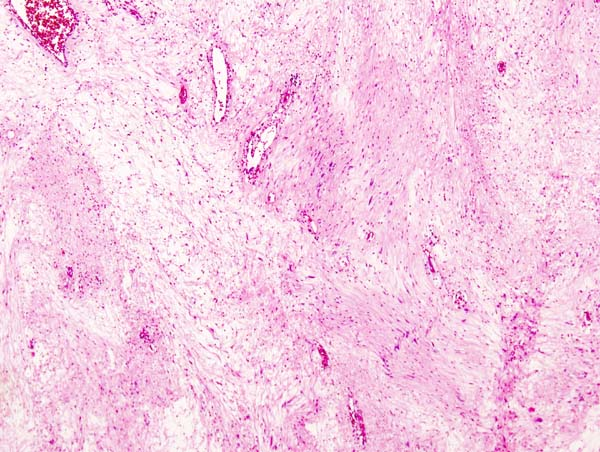

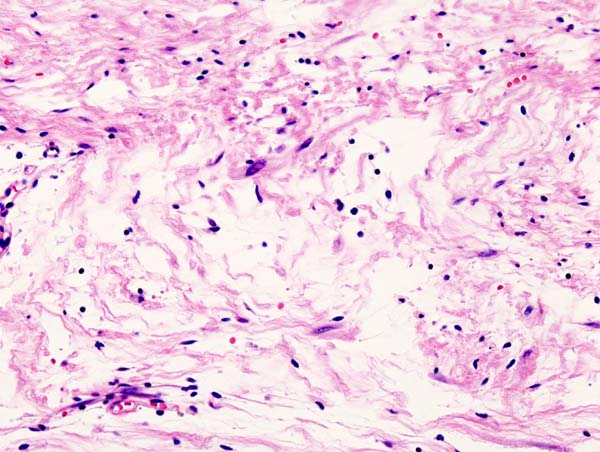

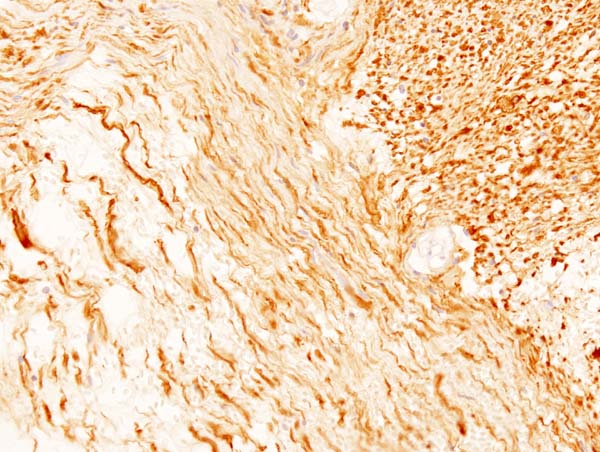

== See also ==
- Intranodal palisaded myofibroblastoma
- List of inclusion bodies that aid in diagnosis of cutaneous conditions
- Neurofibroma
- Palisaded encapsulated neuroma
