= IPM Zmaj =

Serbian company

- Official logo
- Native name: ИПМ Змај
- Formerly: Fabrika Aeroplana i Hidroaviona Zmaj
- Company type: Joint-stock company
- Predecessor: Zmaj
- Founded: 31 December 1997; 28 years ago (Current form); October 1946; 79 years ago (Originally founded)
- Headquarters: Autoput 18, Zemun, Serbia
- Key people: Radoslava Haluplka (Director)
- Products: Agricultural machinery
- Revenue: ▲€4.01 million (2022)
- Net income: ▼€0.10 million (2022)
- Total assets: ▼€19.32 million (2022)
- Total equity: ▲€10.67 million (2022)
- Owner: Figra d.o.o. (69.40%); Finpro LLC (30.60%)
- Number of employees: 24 (2022)
- Website: www.zmaj.co.rs

IPM Zmaj (Serbian Cyrillic: ИПМ Змај; full legal name: Industrija Poljoprivrednih Mašina Zmaj, Serbian Cyrillic: Индустрија Пољопривредних Машина Змај, lit. 'Agricultural Machinery Industry Zmaj') is a Serbian company that produces small agricultural machines.

== History ==
The company emerged in October 1946 from the nationalized aircraft producer Zmaj. It was privatized in 2006.

Once known worldwide for its combine harvesters, in 2017 the company employed around 40 people and owned more than 200 hectares of land. As of 2022 consolidated annual report, the company had 4.01 million euros in total revenue and 24 employees.

== Gallery ==
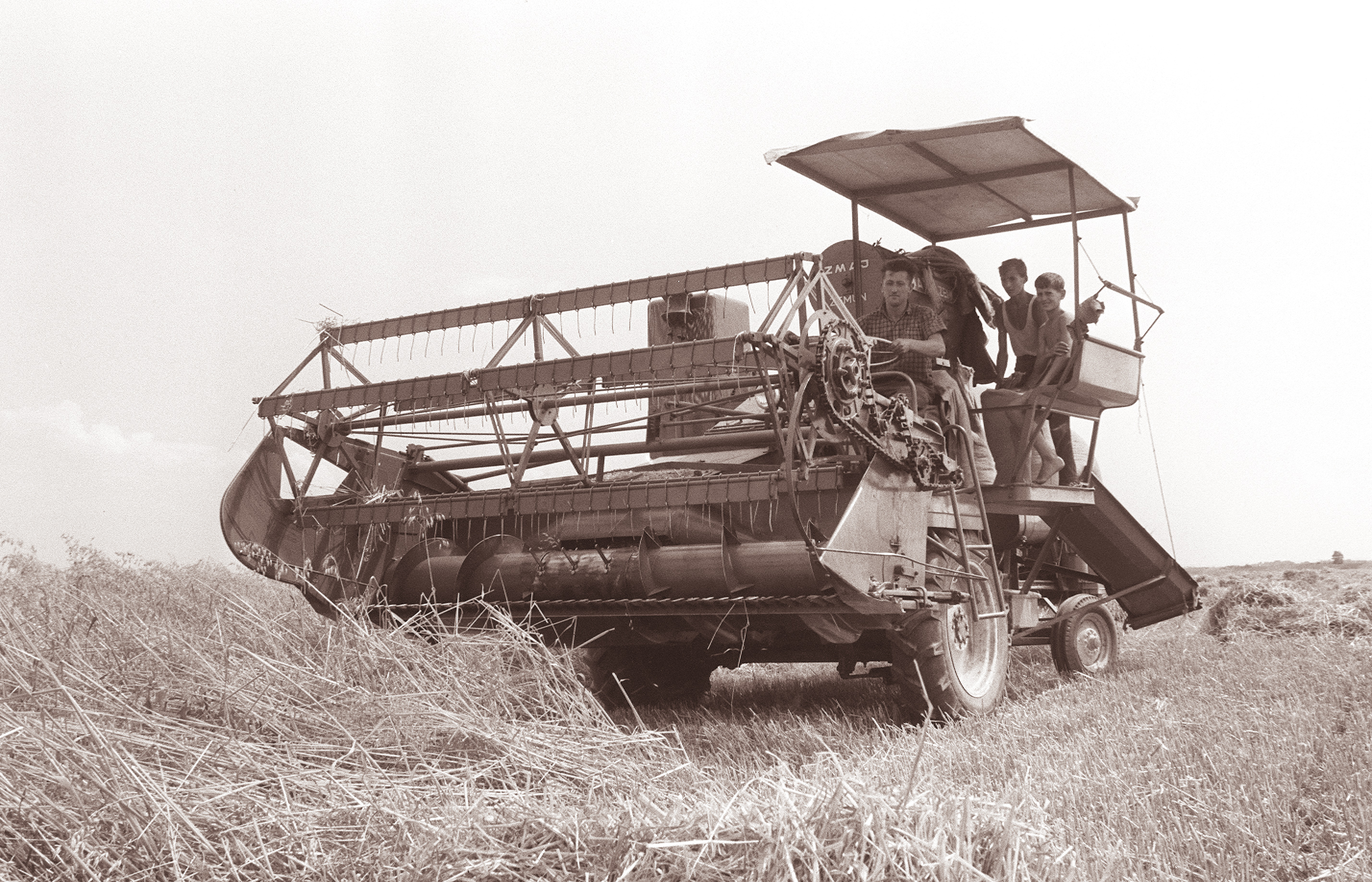
Zmaj combine in 1960s

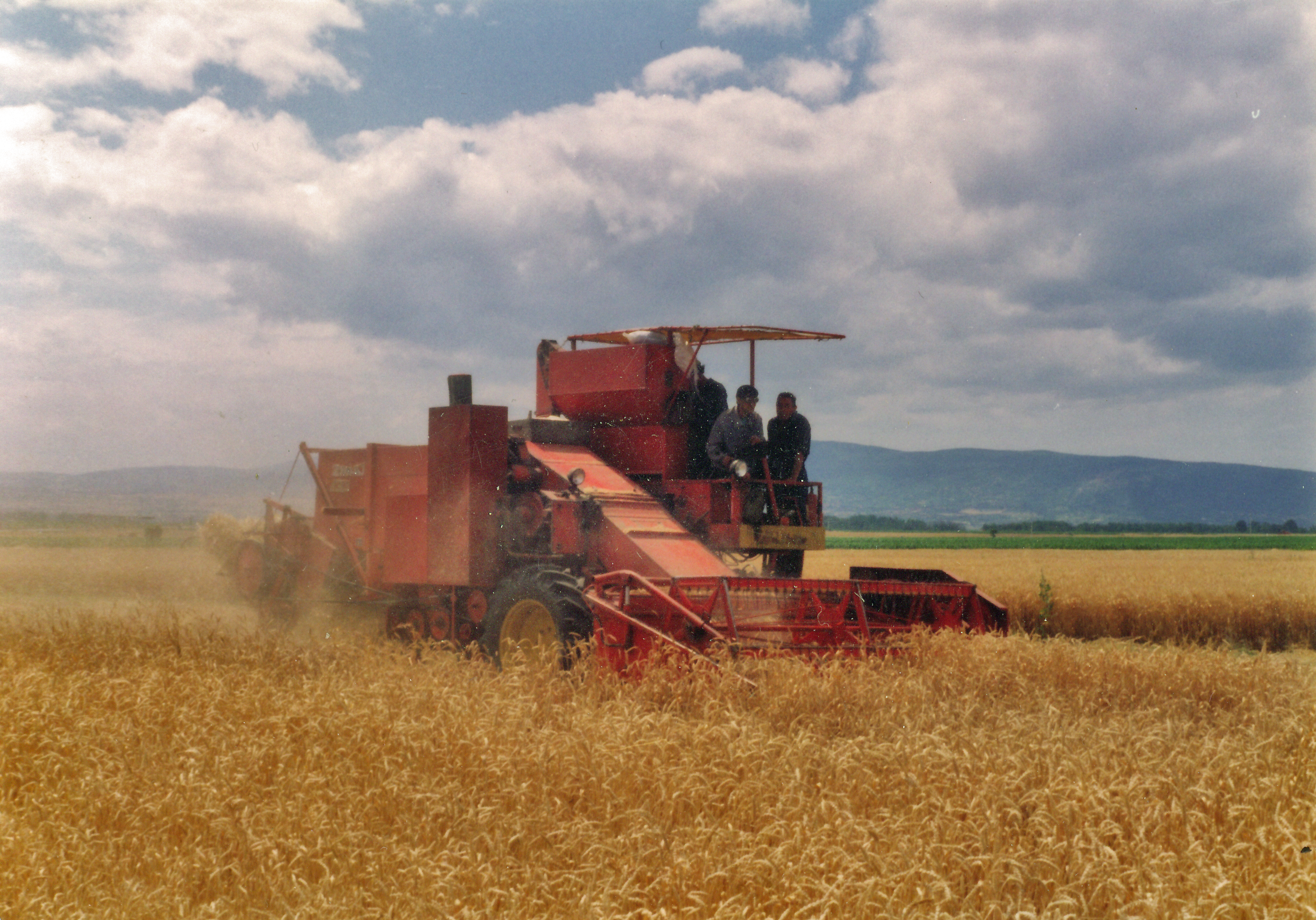
Zmaj combine in 1990s
