= Brain tumor =

Neoplasm in the brain

- Other names: Intracranial neoplasm, brain tumour
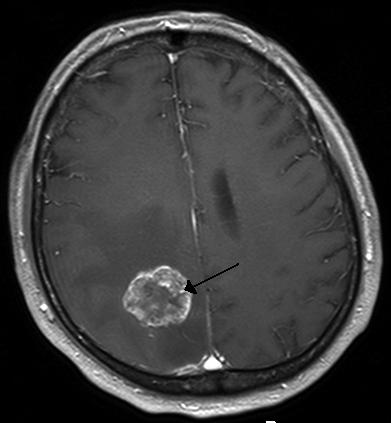
- Brain metastasis in the right cerebral hemisphere from lung cancer, shown on magnetic resonance imaging
- Specialty: Neurosurgery, neuro-oncology
- Symptoms: Vary depending on the part of the brain involved, headaches, seizures, problem with vision, vomiting, mental changes
- Types: Malignant, benign
- Causes: Usually unknown
- Risk factors: Neurofibromatosis, exposure to vinyl chloride, Epstein–Barr virus, ionizing radiation
- Diagnostic method: Computed tomography, magnetic resonance imaging, tissue biopsy
- Treatment: Surgery, radiation therapy, chemotherapy
- Medication: Anticonvulsants, dexamethasone, furosemide
- Prognosis: Average five-year survival rate 33% (US)
- Frequency: 1.2 million nervous system cancers (2015)
- Deaths: 228,800 (worldwide, 2015)

A brain tumor (sometimes referred to as brain cancer) occurs when a group of cells within the brain grow out of control, creating a mass. There are two main types of tumors: malignant (cancerous) tumors and benign (non-cancerous) tumors. These can be further classified as primary tumors, which start within the brain, and secondary tumors, which most commonly have spread from tumors located outside the brain, known as brain metastasis tumors. All types of brain tumors may produce symptoms that vary depending on the size of the tumor and the part of the brain that is involved. Where symptoms exist, they may include headaches, seizures, problems with vision, vomiting and mental changes. Other symptoms may include difficulty walking, speaking, with sensations, or unconsciousness.

The cause of most brain tumors is unknown, though up to 4% of brain cancers may be caused by CT scan radiation. Uncommon risk factors include exposure to vinyl chloride, Epstein–Barr virus, ionizing radiation, and inherited syndromes such as neurofibromatosis, tuberous sclerosis, and von Hippel-Lindau Disease. Studies on mobile phone exposure have not shown a clear risk. The most common types of primary tumors in adults are meningiomas (usually benign) and astrocytomas such as glioblastomas. In children, the most common type is a malignant medulloblastoma. Diagnosis is usually by medical examination along with computed tomography (CT) or magnetic resonance imaging (MRI). The result is then often confirmed by a biopsy. Based on the findings, the tumors are divided into different grades of severity.

Treatment may include some combination of surgery, radiation therapy and chemotherapy. If seizures occur, anticonvulsant medication may be needed. Dexamethasone and furosemide are medications that may be used to decrease swelling around the tumor. Some tumors grow gradually, requiring only monitoring and possibly needing no further intervention. Treatments that use a person's immune system are being studied. Outcomes for malignant tumors vary considerably depending on the type of tumor and how far it has spread at diagnosis. Although benign tumors only grow in one area, they may still be life-threatening depending on their size and location. Malignant glioblastomas usually have very poor outcomes, while benign meningiomas usually have good outcomes. The average five-year survival rate for all (malignant) brain cancers in the United States is 33%.

Secondary, or metastatic, brain tumors are about four times as common as primary brain tumors, with about half of metastases coming from lung cancer. Primary brain tumors occur in around 250,000 people a year globally, and make up less than 2% of cancers. In children younger than 15, brain tumors are second only to acute lymphoblastic leukemia as the most common form of cancer. In New South Wales, Australia in 2005, the average lifetime economic cost of a case of brain cancer was AU$1.9 million, the greatest of any type of cancer.

== Signs and symptoms ==
The signs and symptoms of brain tumors are broad. People may experience symptoms regardless of whether the tumor is benign (not cancerous) or cancerous. Primary and secondary brain tumors present with similar symptoms, depending on the location, size, and rate of growth of the tumor. For example, larger tumors in the frontal lobe can cause changes in the ability to think. However, a smaller tumor in an area such as Wernicke's area (small area responsible for language comprehension) can result in a greater loss of function.

=== Headaches ===
Headaches as a result of raised intracranial pressure can be an early symptom of brain cancer. However, isolated headache without other symptoms is rare, and other symptoms including visual abnormalities may occur before headaches become common. Certain warning signs for headache exist which make the headache more likely to be associated with brain cancer. These are defined as "abnormal neurological examination, headache worsened by Valsalva maneuver, headache causing awakening from sleep, new headache in the older population, progressively worsening headache, atypical headache features, or patients who do not fulfill the strict definition of migraine". Other associated signs are headaches that are worse in the morning or that subside after vomiting.

=== Location-specific symptoms ===
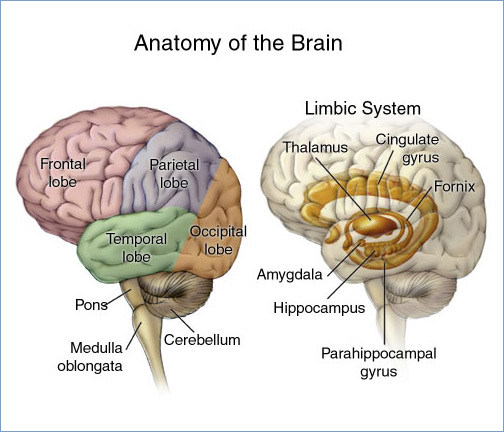
The main areas of the brain and limbic system

The brain is divided into lobes and each lobe or area has its own function. A tumour in any of these lobes may affect the area's performance. The symptoms experienced are often linked to the location of the tumour, but each person may experience something different.

- Frontal lobe: Tumours may contribute to poor reasoning, inappropriate social behavior, personality changes, poor planning, lower inhibition, and decreased production of speech (Broca's area).
- Temporal lobe: Tumours in this lobe may contribute to poor memory, loss of hearing, and difficulty in language comprehension (Wernicke's area is located in this lobe).
- Parietal lobe: Tumours here may result in poor interpretation of languages, difficulty with speaking, writing, drawing, naming, and recognizing, and poor spatial and visual perception.
- Occipital lobe: Damage to this lobe may result in poor vision or loss of vision.
- Cerebellum: Tumours in this area may cause poor balance, muscle movement, and posture.
- Brain stem: Tumours on the brainstem can cause seizures, endocrine problems, respiratory changes, visual changes, headaches and partial paralysis.
- Leptomeninges: Tumours that spread to the leptomeninges, the lining of the brain, may cause cranial nerve palsies such as facial paralysis, abnormalities of eye movement, abnormalities of facial sensation or swallowing difficulty, depending on which cranial nerves are involved.

=== Behaviour changes ===
A person's personality may be altered due to the tumor damaging lobes of the brain. Since the frontal, temporal, and parietal lobes control inhibition, emotions, mood, judgement, reasoning, and behavior, a tumor in those regions can cause inappropriate social behavior, temper tantrums, laughing at things which merit no laughter, and even psychological symptoms such as depression and anxiety. More research is needed into the effectiveness and safety of medication for depression in people with brain tumors.

Personality changes can have damaging effects such as unemployment, unstable relationships, and a lack of control.

== Cause ==
A known cause of brain cancers is ionizing radiation. Approximately 4% of brain cancers in the general population are caused by CT-scan radiation. For brain cancers that follow a CT scan at lags of 2 years or more, it has been estimated that 40% are attributable to CT-scan radiation. The risk of brain cancer is dose dependent, with the relative risk increasing by 0.8 for each 100 gray of ionizing radiation received. At this dose, approximately 6391 people would have to be exposed to cause 1 case of brain cancer.

Mutations and deletions of tumor suppressor genes, such as P53, are thought to be the cause of some forms of brain tumor. Inherited conditions, such as Von Hippel–Lindau disease, tuberous sclerosis, multiple endocrine neoplasia, and neurofibromatosis type 2 carry a high risk for the development of brain tumors. People with celiac disease have a slightly increased risk of developing brain tumors. Smoking may increase the risk, but evidence of this remains unclear.

Although studies have not shown any link between cell-phone or mobile-phone radiation and the occurrence of brain tumors, the World Health Organization has classified mobile-phone radiation on the IARC scale into Group 2B – possibly carcinogenic. The claim that cell-phone usage may cause brain cancer is likely based on epidemiological studies which observed a slight increase in glioma risk among heavy users of wireless phones. When those studies were conducted, GSM (2G) phones were in use. Modern, third-generation (3G) phones emit, on average, about 1% of the energy emitted by those GSM (2G) phones, and therefore the finding of an association between cell-phone usage and increased risk of brain cancer is not based upon current phone usage.

== Pathophysiology ==
=== Meninges ===
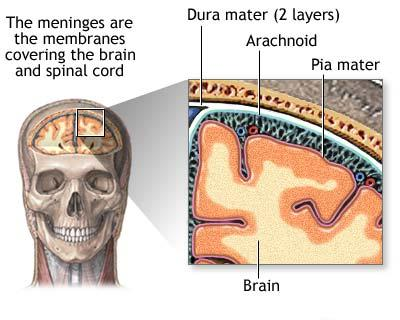
The meninges lie between the skull and brain matter. Tumors originating from the meninges are meningiomas.

Human brains are surrounded by a system of connective tissue membranes called meninges that separate the brain from the skull. This three-layered covering is composed of (from the outside in) the dura mater, arachnoid mater, and pia mater. The arachnoid and pia are physically connected and thus often considered as a single layer, the leptomeninges. Between the arachnoid mater and the pia mater is the subarachnoid space which contains cerebrospinal fluid (CSF). This fluid circulates in the narrow spaces between cells and through the cavities in the brain called ventricles, to support and protect the brain tissue. Blood vessels enter the central nervous system through the perivascular space above the pia mater. The cells in the blood vessel walls are joined tightly, forming the blood–brain barrier which protects the brain from toxins that might enter through the blood.

Tumors of the meninges are meningiomas and are often benign. Though not technically a tumor of brain tissue, they are often considered brain tumors since they protrude into the space where the brain is, causing symptoms. Since they are usually slow-growing tumors, meningiomas can be quite large by the time symptoms appear.

=== Brain matter ===
The three largest divisions of the brain are the cerebral cortex, cerebellum and the brainstem. These areas are composed of two broad classes of cells: neurons and glia. These two cell types are equally numerous in the brain as a whole, although glial cells outnumber neurons roughly 4 to 1 in the cerebral cortex. Glia come in several types, which perform a number of critical functions, including structural support, metabolic support, insulation, and guidance of development. Primary tumors of the glial cells are called gliomas and often are malignant by the time they are diagnosed.

The thalamus and hypothalamus are major divisions of the diencephalon, with the pituitary gland and pineal gland attached at the bottom; tumors of the pituitary and pineal gland are often benign.

The brainstem lies between the large cerebral cortex and the spinal cord. It is divided into the midbrain, pons, and medulla oblongata.

=== Diagnosis ===
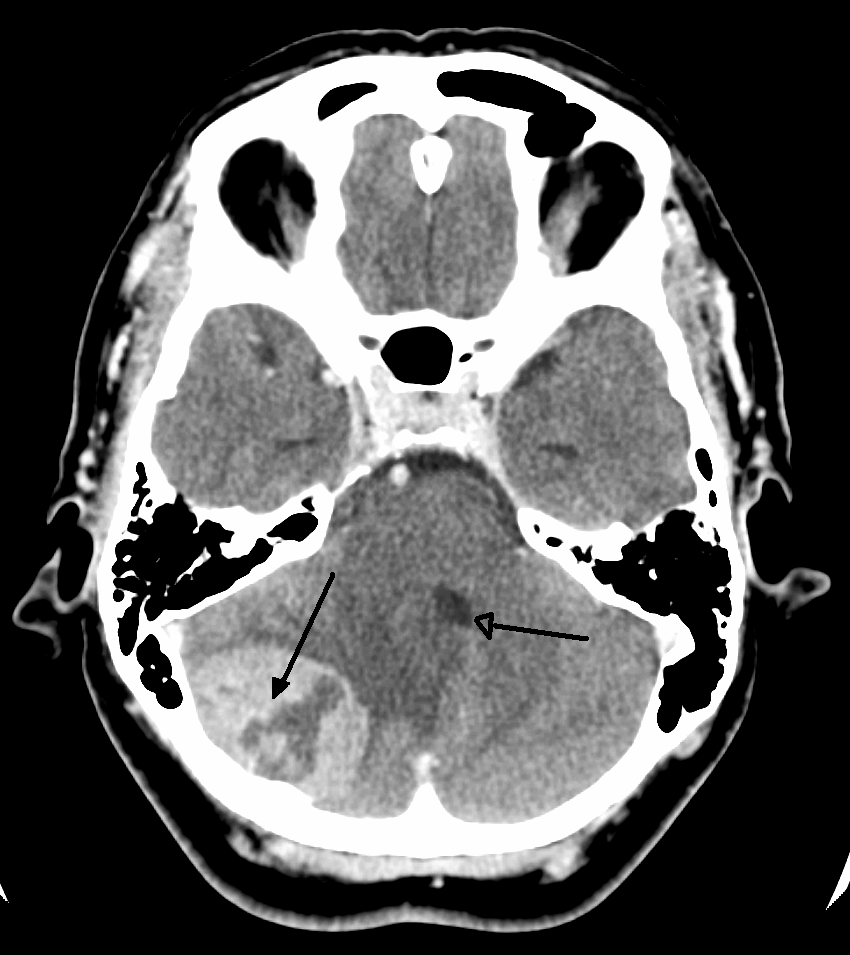
A posterior fossa tumor leading to mass effect and midline shift

There are no specific signs or symptoms for brain cancer, but the presence of a combination of symptoms and the lack of alternative causes may indicate a brain tumor. A medical history aids in the diagnosis. Clinical and laboratory investigations will serve to exclude infections as the cause of the symptoms.

Brain tumors, when compared to tumors in other areas of the body, pose a challenge for diagnosis. Commonly, radioactive tracers are uptaken in large volumes in tumors due to the high activity of tumor cells, allowing for radioactive imaging of the tumor. However, most of the brain is separated from the blood by the blood–brain barrier (BBB), a membrane that exerts a strict control over what substances are allowed to pass into the brain. Therefore, many tracers that may reach tumors in other areas of the body easily would be unable to reach brain tumors until there was a disruption of the BBB by the tumor. Disruption of the BBB is well imaged via MRI or CT scan, and is therefore regarded as the main diagnostic indicator for malignant gliomas, meningiomas, and brain metastases.

=== Imaging ===
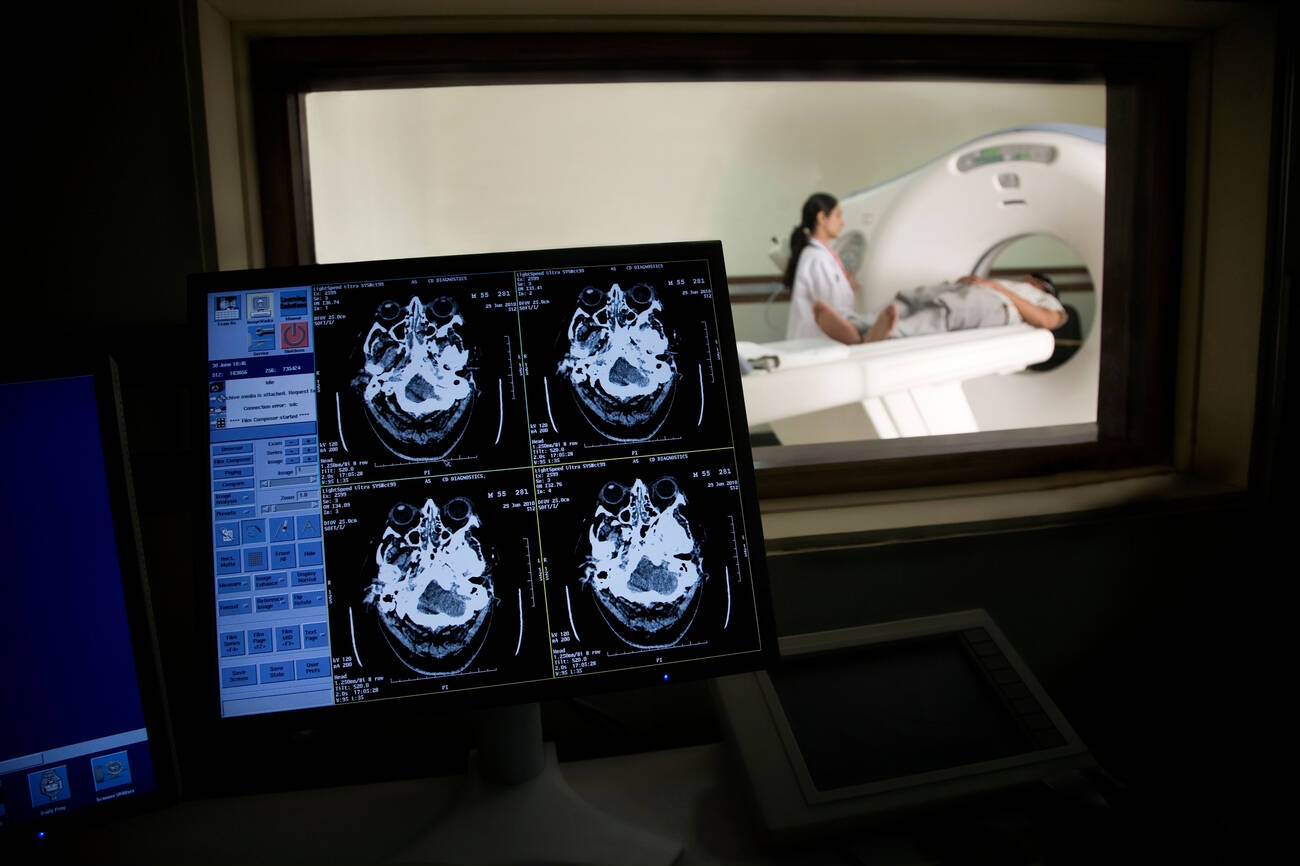
A clinical neuroradiology acquisition workstation. Disruption of the blood–brain barrier is assessed by imaging contrast enhancement profiles on cross-sectional CT and MRI slices to differentiate tumor margins from normal brain structures.

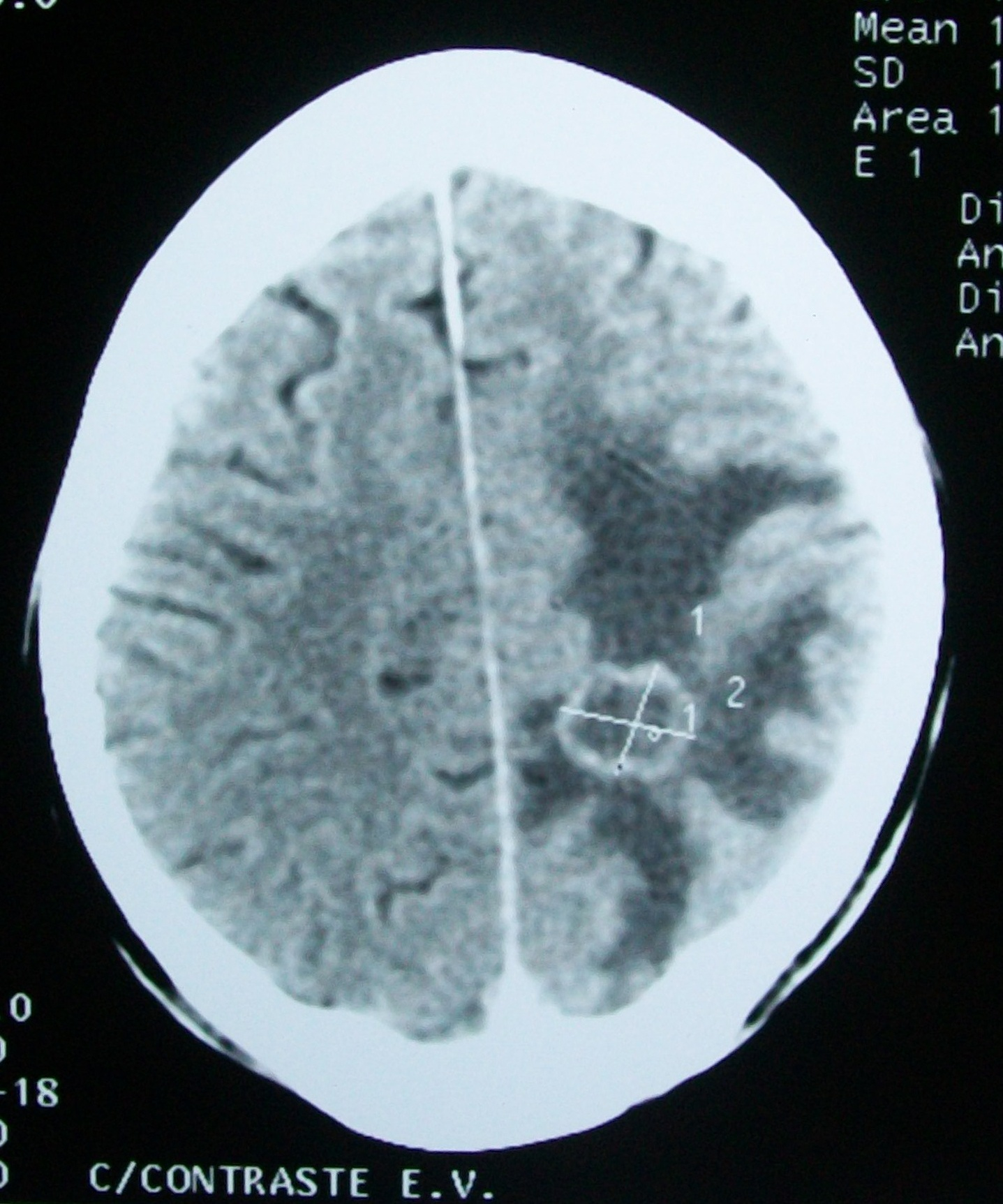
CT scan of a brain tumor, with its diameters marked as an X. There is hypoattenuating (dark) peritumoral edema in the surrounding white matter, with a "finger-like" spread.

Medical imaging plays a central role in the diagnosis of brain tumors. Early imaging methods – invasive and sometimes dangerous – such as pneumoencephalography and cerebral angiography have been replaced by non-invasive, high-resolution techniques, especially magnetic resonance imaging (MRI) and computed tomography (CT) scans. MRI with contrast enhancement is the preferred imaging test in the diagnosis of brain tumors. Glioblastomas usually enhance with contrast on T1 MRI weighted MRI imaging, and on T2 with FLAIR imaging showing hyperintense cerebral edema. Low grade gliomas are usually hypointense on T1 MRI, and hyperintense with T2 with FLAIR MRI. Meningiomas are usually homogenously enhanced with dural thickening on MRI.

Treatment with radiation can lead to treatment induced changes in the brain, including radiation necrosis (death of brain tissue due to radiation treatments) visible on brain imaging and which can be difficult to differentiate from tumor recurrence.

==== Different Types of MRI Scans ====
Magnetic Resonance Angiography (MRA) – looks at the blood vessels in the brain. In the diagnosis of brain tumor, MRAs are typically carried out before surgery to help surgeons get a better understanding of the tumor vasculature. For example, a study was done where surgeons were able to separate benign brain tumors from malignant ones by analyzing the shapes of the blood vessels that were extracted from MRA. Although not required, some MRA may inject contrast agent, gadolinium, into the patient to get an enhanced image

Magnetic Resonance Spectroscopy (MRS) – measures the metabolic changes or chemical changes inside the tumor. The most common MRS is proton spectroscopy with its frequency measured in parts per million (ppm). Gliomas or malignant brain tumors have different spectra from normal brain tissue in that they have greater choline levels and lower N-acetyl aspartate (NAA) signals. Using MRS in brain tumor diagnosis can help doctors identify the type of tumor and its aggressiveness. For example, benign brain tumors or meningioma have increased alanine levels. It can also help to distinguish brain tumors from scar tissues or dead tissues caused by previous radiation treatment, which does not have increased choline levels that brain tumors have, and from tumor-mimicking lesions such as abscesses or infarcts.

Perfusion Magnetic Resonance Imaging (pMRI) – assess the blood volume and blood flow of different parts of the brain and brain tumors. pMRI requires the injection of contrast agent, usually gadopentetate dimeglumine (Gd-DTPA) into the veins in order to enhance the contrast. pMRI provides a cerebral blood volume map that shows the tumor vascularity and angiogenesis. Brain tumors would require a larger blood supply and thus, would show a high cerebral blood volume on the pMRI map. The vascular morphology and degree of angiogenesis from pMRI help to determine the grade and malignancy of brain tumors. For brain tumor diagnosis, pMRI is useful in determining the best site to perform biopsy and to help reduce sampling error. pMRI is also valuable for after treatment to determine if the abnormal area is a remaining tumor or a scar tissue. For patients that are undergoing anti-angiogenesis cancer therapy, pMRI can give the doctors a better sense of efficacy of the treatment by monitoring tumor cerebral blood volume.

Functional MRI (fMRI) – measures blood flow changes in active parts of the brain while the patient is performing tasks and provides specific locations of the brain that are responsible for certain functions. Before performing a brain tumor surgery on patients, neurosurgeons would use fMRI to avoid damage to structures of the brain that correspond with important brain functions while resecting the tumor at the same time. Preoperative fMRI is important because it is often difficult to distinguish the anatomy near the tumor as it distorts its surrounding regions. Neurosurgeons would use fMRI to plan whether to perform a resection where tumor is surgically removed as much as possible, a biopsy where they take a surgical sampling amount to provide a diagnosis, or to not undergo surgery at all. For example, a neurosurgeon may be opposed to resecting a tumor near the motor cortex as that would affect the patient's movements. Without preoperative fMRI, the neurosurgeon would have to perform an awake-craniotomy where the patient would have to interact during open surgery to see if tumor removal would affect important brain functions.

Diffusion Weighted Imaging (DWI) – a form of MRI that measures random Brownian motion of water molecules along a magnetic field gradient. For brain tumor diagnosis, measurement of apparent diffusion coefficient (ADC) in brain tumors allow doctors to categorize tumor type. Most brain tumors have higher ADC than normal brain tissues and doctors can match the observed ADC of the patient's brain tumor with a list of accepted ADC to identify tumor type. DWI is also useful for treatment and therapy purposes where changes in diffusion can be analyzed in response to drug, radiation, or gene therapy. Successful response results in apoptosis and increase in diffusion while failed treatment results in unchanged diffusion values.

==== Other Types of Imaging Techniques ====
Computed Tomography (CT) Scan – uses x-rays to take pictures from different angles and computer processing to combine the pictures into a 3D image. A CT scan usually serves as an alternative to MRI in cases where the patient cannot have an MRI due to claustrophobia or pacemaker. Compared to MRI, a CT scan shows a more detailed image of the bone structures near the tumor and can be used to measure the tumor's size. Like an MRI, a contrast dye may also be injected into the veins or ingested by mouth before a CT scan to better outline any tumors that may be present. CT scans use contrast materials that are iodine-based and barium sulfate compounds. The downside of using CT scans as opposed to MRI is that some brain tumors do not show up well on CT scans because some intra-axial masses are faint and resemble normal brain tissue. In some scenarios, brain tumors in CT scans may be mistaken for infarction, infection, and demyelination. To suspect that an intra-axial mass is a brain tumor instead of other possibilities, there must be unexplained calcifications in the brain, preservation of the cortex, and disproportionate mass effect.

CT Angiography (CTA) – provides information about the blood vessels in the brain using X-rays. A contrast agent is always required to be injected into the patient in the CT scanner. CTA serves as an alternative to MRA.

Positron Emission Tomography (PET) Scan – uses radiolabelled substances, such as FDG which taken up by cells that are actively dividing. Tumor cells are more actively dividing so they would absorb more of the radioactive substance. After injection, a scanner would be used to create an image of the radioactive areas in the brain. PET scans are used more often for high-grade tumors than for low-grade tumors. It is useful after treatment to help doctors determine if the abnormal area on an MRI image is a remaining tumor or a scar tissue. Scar tissues will not show up on PET scans while tumors would.

=== Pathology ===
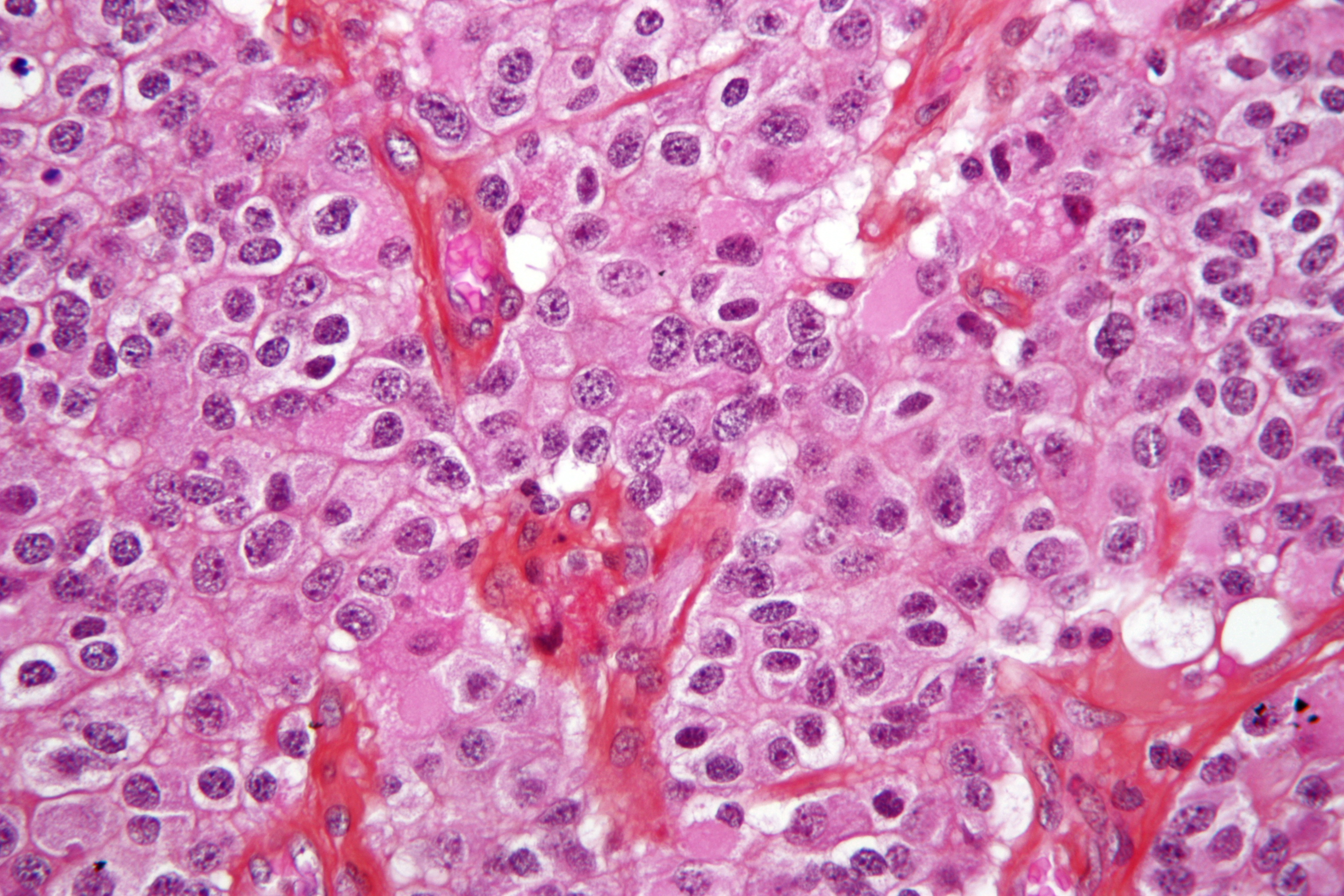
Micrograph of an oligodendroglioma, a type of brain cancer. Brain biopsy. H&E stain.

Maximal safe surgical resection (to preserve as much neurological function as possible) and histologic examination of the tumor is also required to aid in the diagnosis. Cancer cells may have specific characteristics.

Atypia: an indication of abnormality of a cell (which may be indicative of malignancy). Significance of the abnormality is highly dependent on context.

Neoplasia: the (uncontrolled) division of cells that is characteristic of cancer.

Necrosis: the (premature) death of cells, caused by external factors such as infection, toxin or trauma. Necrotic cells send the wrong chemical signals which prevent phagocytes from disposing of the dead cells, leading to a buildup of dead tissue, cell debris and toxins at or near the site of the necrotic cells

Local hypoxia, or the deprivation of adequate oxygen supply to certain areas of the brain, including within the tumor, as the tumor grows and recruits local blood vessels.

=== Classification ===
Tumors can be benign or malignant, can occur in different parts of the brain, and may be classified as primary or secondary. A primary tumor is one that has started in the brain, as opposed to a metastatic tumor, which is one that has spread to the brain from another area of the body. The incidence of metastatic tumors is approximately four times greater than primary tumors. Tumors may or may not be symptomatic: some tumors are discovered because the patient has symptoms, others show up incidentally on an imaging scan, or at an autopsy.

Grading of the tumors of the central nervous system commonly occurs on a 4-point scale (I-IV) created by the World Health Organization in 1993. Grade I tumors are the least severe and commonly associated with long-term survival, with severity and prognosis worsening as the grade increases. Low-grade tumors are often benign, while higher grades are aggressively malignant and/or metastatic. Other grading scales do exist, many based upon the same criteria as the WHO scale and graded from I-IV.

==== Primary ====
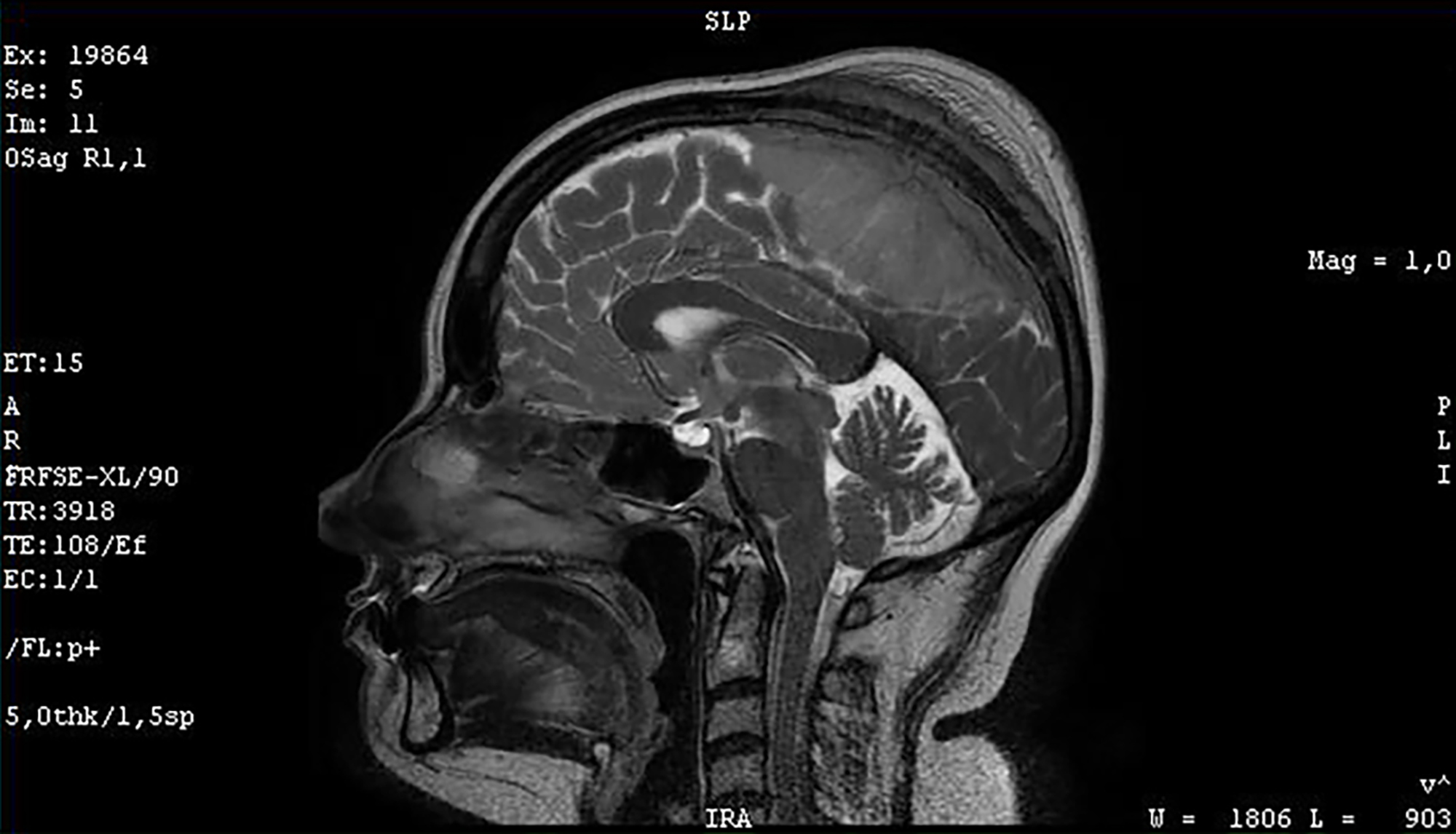
Meningioma of the middle third of the sagittal sinus with large hyperostosis

The most common primary brain tumors are:

- Gliomas (50.4%)
- Meningiomas (20.8%)
- Pituitary adenomas (15%)
- Nerve sheath tumors (10%)

These common tumors can also be organized according to tissue of origin as shown below:

Tissue of origin	Children	Adults
Astrocytes	Pilocytic Astrocytoma (PCA)	Glioblastoma
Oligodendrocytes		Oligodendroglioma
Ependyma	Ependymoma	
Neurons	Medulloblastoma	
Meninges		Meningioma

==== Secondary ====
Secondary tumors of the brain are metastatic and have spread to the brain from cancers originating in another organ. Metastatic spread is usually by the blood. The most common types of cancers that spread to the brain are lung cancer (accounting for over half of all cases), breast cancer, melanoma skin cancer, kidney cancer and colon cancer.

===== By behavior =====
Brain tumors can be cancerous (malignant) or non-cancerous (benign). However, the definitions of malignant or benign neoplasms differ from those commonly used in other types of cancerous or non-cancerous neoplasms in the body. In cancers elsewhere in the body, three malignant properties differentiate benign tumors from malignant forms of cancer: benign tumors are self-limited and do not invade or metastasize. Characteristics of malignant tumors include:

- uncontrolled mitosis (growth by division beyond the normal limits)
- anaplasia: the cells in the neoplasm have an obviously different form (in size and shape). Anaplastic cells display marked pleomorphism. The cell nuclei are characteristically extremely hyperchromatic (darkly stained) and enlarged; the nucleus might have the same size as the cytoplasm of the cell (nuclear-cytoplasmic ratio may approach 1:1, instead of the normal 1:4 or 1:6 ratio). Giant cells – considerably larger than their neighbors – may form and possess either one enormous nucleus or several nuclei (syncytia). Anaplastic nuclei are variable and bizarre in size and shape.
- invasion or infiltration:
  - Invasion or invasiveness is the spatial expansion of the tumor through uncontrolled mitosis, in the sense that the neoplasm invades the space occupied by adjacent tissue, thereby pushing the other tissue aside and eventually compressing the tissue. Often these tumors are associated with clearly outlined tumors in imaging.
  - Infiltration is the behavior of the tumor either to grow (microscopic) tentacles that push into the surrounding tissue (often making the outline of the tumor undefined or diffuse) or to have tumor cells "seeded" into the tissue beyond the circumference of the tumorous mass.
- metastasis (spread to other locations in the body via lymph or blood).

==== By genetics ====
In 2016, the WHO restructured their classifications of some categories of gliomas to include distinct genetic mutations that have been useful in differentiating tumor types, prognoses, and treatment responses. Genetic mutations are typically detected via immunohistochemistry, a technique that visualizes the presence or absence of a targeted protein via staining.

- Mutations in IDH1 and IDH2 genes are commonly found in low-grade gliomas
- Loss of both IDH genes combined with loss of chromosome arms 1p and 19q indicates the tumor is an oligodendroglioma
- Loss of TP53 and ATRX characterizes astrocytomas
- Genes EGFR, TERT, and PTEN, are commonly altered in gliomas and are useful in differentiating tumor grade and biology

==== Specific types ====
Anaplastic astrocytoma, Anaplastic oligodendroglioma, Astrocytoma, Central neurocytoma, Choroid plexus carcinoma, Choroid plexus papilloma, Choroid plexus tumor, Colloid cyst, Dysembryoplastic neuroepithelial tumour, Ependymal tumor, Fibrillary astrocytoma, Giant-cell glioblastoma, Glioblastoma, Gliomatosis cerebri, Gliosarcoma, Hemangiopericytoma, Medulloblastoma, Medulloepithelioma, Meningeal carcinomatosis, Neuroblastoma, Neurocytoma, Oligoastrocytoma, Oligodendroglioma, Optic nerve sheath meningioma, Pediatric ependymoma, Pilocytic astrocytoma, Pinealoblastoma, Pineocytoma, Pleomorphic anaplastic neuroblastoma, Pleomorphic xanthoastrocytoma, Primary central nervous system lymphoma, Sphenoid wing meningioma, Subependymal giant cell astrocytoma, Subependymoma, Trilateral retinoblastoma.

== Treatment ==
A medical team generally assesses the treatment options and presents them to the person affected and their family. Various types of treatment are available depending on tumor type and location, and may be combined to produce the best chances of survival:

- Surgery: complete or partial resection of the tumor with the objective of removing as many tumor cells as possible.
- Radiotherapy: the most commonly used treatment for brain tumors; the tumor is irradiated with beta, X-rays or gamma rays.
- Chemotherapy: a treatment option for cancer, however, it is not always used to treat brain tumors as the blood–brain barrier can prevent some drugs from reaching the cancerous cells.
- A variety of experimental therapies are available through clinical trials.

Survival rates in primary brain tumors depend on the type of tumor, age, functional status of the patient, the extent of surgical removal and other factors specific to each case.

Standard care for anaplastic oligodendrogliomas and anaplastic oligoastrocytomas is surgery followed by radiotherapy. One study found a survival benefit for the addition of chemotherapy to radiotherapy after surgery, compared with radiotherapy alone.

=== Surgery ===
Surgical resection of the greatest extent of contrast enhancing tumor possible (gross total resection) is associated with increased overall and progression free survival in those with glioblastoma. Gross total resection is often required in other brain tumors. Minimally invasive techniques are becoming the dominant trend in neurosurgical oncology. The main objective of surgery is to remove as many tumor cells as possible, with complete removal being the best outcome and cytoreduction ("debulking") of the tumor may otherwise be done. Due to the infiltrative nature of glioblastomas, total resection is usually unachievable and progression after surgery usually occurs, with progression occurring about 7 months after surgery.

Many meningiomas, with the exception of some tumors located at the skull base, can be successfully removed surgically. Most pituitary adenomas can be removed surgically, often using a minimally invasive approach through the nasal cavity and skull base (trans-nasal, trans-sphenoidal approach). Large pituitary adenomas require a craniotomy (opening of the skull) for their removal. Radiotherapy, including stereotactic approaches, is reserved for inoperable cases.

Postoperative radiotherapy and chemotherapy are integral parts of the therapeutic standard for malignant tumors.

Multiple metastatic tumors are generally treated with radiotherapy and chemotherapy rather than surgery and the prognosis in such cases is determined by the primary tumor, and is generally poor.

=== Radiation therapy ===
The goal of radiation therapy is to kill tumor cells while leaving normal brain tissue unharmed. In standard external beam radiation therapy, multiple treatments of standard-dose "fractions" of radiation are applied to the brain. This process is repeated for a total of 10 to 30 treatments, depending on the type of tumor. This additional treatment provides some patients with improved outcomes and better survival rates.

Radiosurgery is a treatment method that uses computerized calculations to focus radiation at the site of the tumor while minimizing the radiation dose to the surrounding brain. Radiosurgery may be an adjunct to other treatments, or it may represent the primary treatment technique for some tumors. Forms used include stereotactic radiosurgery, such as Gamma knife, Cyberknife or Novalis Tx radiosurgery.

Radiotherapy is the most common treatment for secondary brain tumors. The amount of radiotherapy depends on the size of the area of the brain affected by cancer. Conventional external beam "whole-brain radiotherapy treatment" (WBRT) or "whole-brain irradiation" may be suggested if there is a risk that other secondary tumors will develop in the future. Stereotactic radiotherapy is usually recommended in cases involving fewer than three small secondary brain tumors. Radiotherapy may be used following, or in some cases in place of, resection of the tumor. Forms of radiotherapy used for brain cancer include external beam radiation therapy, the most common, and brachytherapy and proton therapy, the last especially used for children.

People who receive stereotactic radiosurgery (SRS) and whole-brain radiation therapy (WBRT) for the treatment of metastatic brain tumors have more than twice the risk of developing learning and memory problems than those treated with SRS alone. Results of a 2021 systematic review found that when using SRS as the initial treatment, survival or death related to brain metastasis was not greater than alone versus SRS with WBRT.

Postoperative conventional daily radiotherapy improves survival for adults with good functional well-being and high grade glioma compared to no postoperative radiotherapy. Hypofractionated radiation therapy has similar efficacy for survival as compared to conventional radiotherapy, particularly for individuals aged 60 and older with glioblastoma.

=== Chemotherapy ===
Patients undergoing chemotherapy are administered drugs designed to kill tumor cells. Although chemotherapy may improve overall survival in patients with the most malignant primary brain tumors, it does so in only about 20 percent of patients. Chemotherapy is often used in young children instead of radiation, as radiation may have negative effects on the developing brain. The decision to prescribe this treatment is based on a patient's overall health, type of tumor, and extent of cancer. The toxicity and many side effects of the drugs, and the uncertain outcome of chemotherapy in brain tumors puts this treatment further down the line of treatment options with surgery and radiation therapy preferred.

UCLA Neuro-Oncology publishes real-time survival data for patients with a diagnosis of glioblastoma. They are the only institution in the United States that displays how brain tumor patients are performing on current therapies. They also show a listing of chemotherapy agents used to treat high-grade glioma tumors.

Genetic mutations have significant effects on the effectiveness of chemotherapy. Gliomas with IDH1 or IDH2 mutations respond better to chemotherapy than those without the mutation. Loss of chromosome arms 1p and 19q also indicate better response to chemoradiation.

=== Other ===
A shunt may be used to relieve symptoms caused by intracranial pressure, by reducing the build-up of fluid (hydrocephalus) caused by the blockage of the free flow of cerebrospinal fluid.

For those with brain tumors, anti-seizure prophylactic (preventative) medications are not usually recommended. However, anti-epileptics are used in those with seizures.

Cerebral edema secondary to brain tumors is managed by corticosteroids. Dexamethasone is the preferred corticosteroid due to its long half-life and reduced effect on water retention (mineralcorticoid activity). Bevacizumab (an anti-VEGFA antibody) may improve cerebral edema in those that are unresponsive to steroids.

== Prognosis ==
The prognosis of brain cancer depends on the type of cancer diagnosed. Medulloblastoma has a good prognosis with chemotherapy, radiotherapy, and surgical resection while glioblastoma has a median survival of only 15 months even with aggressive chemoradiotherapy and surgery. Brainstem gliomas have the poorest prognosis of any form of brain cancer, with most patients dying within one year, even with therapy that typically consists of radiation to the tumor along with corticosteroids. However, one type, focal brainstem gliomas in children, seems open to exceptional prognosis and long-term survival has frequently been reported.

Prognosis is also affected by presentation of genetic mutations. Certain mutations provide better prognosis than others. IDH1 and IDH2 mutations in gliomas, as well as deletion of chromosome arms 1p and 19q, generally indicate better prognosis. TP53, ATRX, EGFR, PTEN, and TERT mutations are also useful in determining prognosis.

=== Glioblastoma ===
Glioblastoma is the most aggressive (grade 4) and most common form of a malignant primary brain tumor. Even when aggressive multimodality therapy consisting of radiotherapy, chemotherapy, and surgical excision is used, median survival is only 15–18 months. Standard therapy for glioblastoma consists of maximal surgical resection of the tumor, followed by radiotherapy between two and four weeks after the surgical procedure to remove the cancer, then by chemotherapy, such as temozolomide. Most patients with glioblastoma take a corticosteroid, typically dexamethasone, during their illness to relieve symptoms. Experimental treatments include targeted therapy, gamma knife radiosurgery, boron neutron capture therapy, gene therapy, and chemowafer implants.

=== Oligodendrogliomas ===
Oligodendrogliomas are incurable but slowly progressive malignant brain tumors. They can be treated with surgical resection, chemotherapy, radiotherapy or a combination. For some suspected low-grade (grade II) tumors, only a course of watchful waiting and symptomatic therapy is opted for. These tumors show co-deletions of the p and q arms of chromosome 1 and chromosome 19 respectively (1p19q co-deletion) and have been found to be especially chemosensitive with one report claiming them to be one of the most chemosensitive tumors. A median survival of up to 16.7 years has been reported for grade II oligodendrogliomas.

=== Acoustic neuroma ===
Acoustic neuromas are non-cancerous tumors. They can be treated with surgery, radiation therapy, or observation. Early intervention with surgery or radiation is recommended to prevent progressive hearing loss.

== Epidemiology ==
The incidence of brain tumors is higher in developed countries. This could be explained by undiagnosed tumor-related deaths in resource limited or lower income countries or by early deaths caused by other poverty-related causes that preempt a patient's life before tumors develop.

The incidence of CNS tumors in the United States, Israel, and the Nordic countries is relatively high, while Japan and Asian countries have a lower incidence.

=== United States ===
In the United States in 2015, approximately 166,039 people were living with brain or other central nervous system tumors. Over 2018, it was projected that there would be 23,880 new cases of brain tumors and 16,830 deaths in 2018 as a result, accounting for 1.4 percent of all cancers and 2.8 percent of all cancer deaths. Median age of diagnosis was 58 years old, while median age of death was 65. Diagnosis was slightly more common in males, at approximately 7.5 cases per 100 000 people, while females saw 2 fewer at 5.4. Deaths as a result of brain cancer were 5.3 per 100 000 for males, and 3.6 per 100 000 for females, making brain cancer the 10th leading cause of cancer death in the United States. Overall lifetime risk of developing brain cancer is approximated at 0.6 percent for men and women.

=== UK ===
Brain, other CNS or intracranial tumors are the ninth most common cancer in the UK (around 10,600 people were diagnosed in 2013), and it is the eighth most common cause of cancer death (around 5,200 people died in 2012). White British patients with brain tumour are 30% more likely to die within a year of diagnosis than patients from other ethnicities. The reason for this is unknown.

=== Children ===
In the United States more than 28,000 people under 20 are estimated to have a brain tumor. About 3,720 new cases of brain tumors are expected to be diagnosed in those under 15 in 2019. Higher rates were reported in 1985–1994 than in 1975–1983. There is some debate as to the reasons; one theory is that the trend is the result of improved diagnosis and reporting, since the jump occurred at the same time that MRIs became available widely, and there was no coincident jump in mortality. Central nervous system tumors make up 20–25 percent of cancers in children.

The average survival rate for all primary brain cancers in children is 74%. Brain cancer is the most common cancer in children under 19 and results in more deaths in this age group than leukemia. Younger people have worse prognoses.

The most common brain tumor types in children (0–14) are: pilocytic astrocytoma, malignant glioma, medulloblastoma, neuronal and mixed neuronal-glial tumors, and ependymoma.

In children under 2, about 70% of brain tumors are medulloblastomas, ependymomas, and low-grade gliomas. Less commonly, and seen usually in infants, are teratomas and atypical teratoid rhabdoid tumors. Germ cell tumors, including teratomas, make up just 3% of pediatric primary brain tumors, but the worldwide incidence varies significantly.

In the UK, 429 children aged 14 and under are diagnosed with a brain tumour on average each year, and 563 children and young people under the age of 19 are diagnosed.

== Research ==
=== Immunotherapy ===
Cancer immunotherapy is being actively studied. For malignant gliomas no therapy has been shown to improve life expectancy as of 2015. Brain cancers do not respond to immune checkpoint blockade, due to the intrinsic feature of low immunogenicity, leading to less T cell infiltration to the tumor.

=== Vesicular stomatitis virus ===
In 2000, researchers used the vesicular stomatitis virus (VSV) to infect and kill cancer cells without affecting healthy cells.

=== Retroviral replicating vectors ===
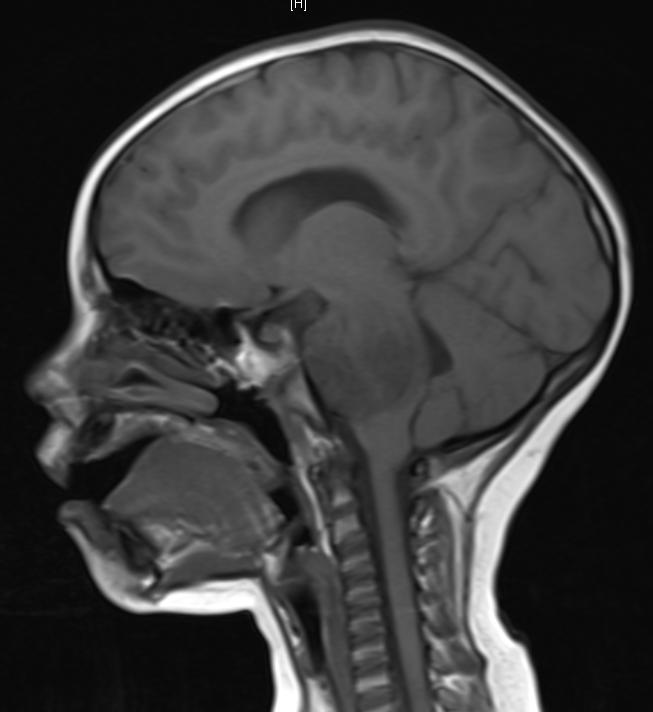
A brainstem glioma in four-year-old. MRI, sagittal, without contrast

Led by Prof. Nori Kasahara, researchers from USC, who are now at UCLA, reported in 2001 the first successful example of applying the use of retroviral replicating vectors towards transducing cell lines derived from solid tumors.Building on this initial work, the researchers applied the technology to in vivo models of cancer and in 2005 reported a long-term survival benefit in an experimental brain tumor animal model. Subsequently, in preparation for human clinical trials, this technology was further developed by Tocagen (a pharmaceutical company primarily focused on brain cancer treatments) as a combination treatment (Toca 511 & Toca FC). This has been under investigation since 2010 in a Phase I/II clinical trial for the potential treatment of recurrent high-grade glioma including glioblastoma and anaplastic astrocytoma. No results have yet been published.

=== Non-invasive detection ===
Efforts to detect and monitor development and treatment response of brain tumors by liquid biopsy from blood, cerebrospinal fluid or urine, are in the early stages of development.

== See also ==
- Brain
- Tumor
- Nervous system neoplasm
- List of people with brain tumors
