= Giant-cell glioblastoma =

Tumor of the central nervous system

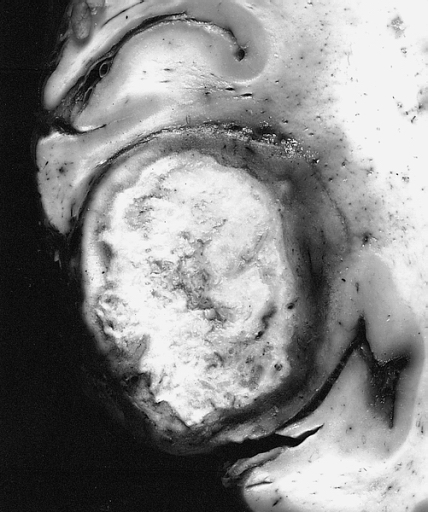
- Some glioblastomas, such as this giant-cell variant, are discrete firm masses which clinically and radiographically simulate metastatic carcinoma

WHO Classification
- Standard name: Giant-cell glioblastoma
- Structure: Neuroepithelial tumors └►Astrocytic tumors └►Glioblastoma └►Giant-cell glioblastoma

ICD-O Code & WHO Grade
- ICD-O Code: 9441/3
- WHO Grade: IV

Synonyms & Acronyms
- Synonyms: Monstrocellular sarcoma

Epidemiology
- Incidence: 0.15/100,000/y new cases/population/year
- Age peak: 42
- M/F ratio: 1.6

Prognosis
- Mean overall survival: 12 months

The giant-cell glioblastoma is a histological variant of glioblastoma, presenting a prevalence of bizarre, multinucleated (more than 20 nuclei) giant (up to 400 μm diameter) cells.

It occasionally shows an abundant stromal reticulin network and presents a high frequency of TP53 gene mutations.

Symptoms and signs are similar to those of the ordinary glioblastoma. Methodology of diagnosis and treatment are the same.

Prognosis is similar to the ordinary glioblastoma, which is approximately 12 months, although some authors refer to cases with a slightly better outcome.

== Historical annotation ==
The giant-cell glioblastoma was originally termed monstrocellular sarcoma, because of its stromal reticulin network, but the astrocytic nature of the tumor was firmly established through the consistent GFAP expression analysis.

== Epidemiology ==
=== Incidence ===
The giant-cell glioblastoma is a rare neoplasia: its incidence is less than 1% of all brain tumors. It represents up to 5% of glioblastomas.

=== Age and sex distribution ===
The mean age at clinical presentation is 42. The age distribution includes children and has a wider range than other diffuse astrocytomas (diffuse WHO grade II astrocytoma, anaplastic astrocytoma, ordinary glioblastoma).

The giant-cell glioblastoma affects males more frequently (the M/F ratio is 1.6).

== Prognosis ==
Most patients with giant-cell glioblastoma have unfavourable prognosis, but some authors report clinical results slightly better than the ordinary glioblastoma, in all probability because this variant seems less infiltrative, due to the nature of giant cells of this type.

== See also ==
- Glioblastoma
- WHO classification of the tumors of the central nervous system
- Grading of the tumors of the central nervous system
