= Sphenoid wing meningioma =

Benign brain tumor

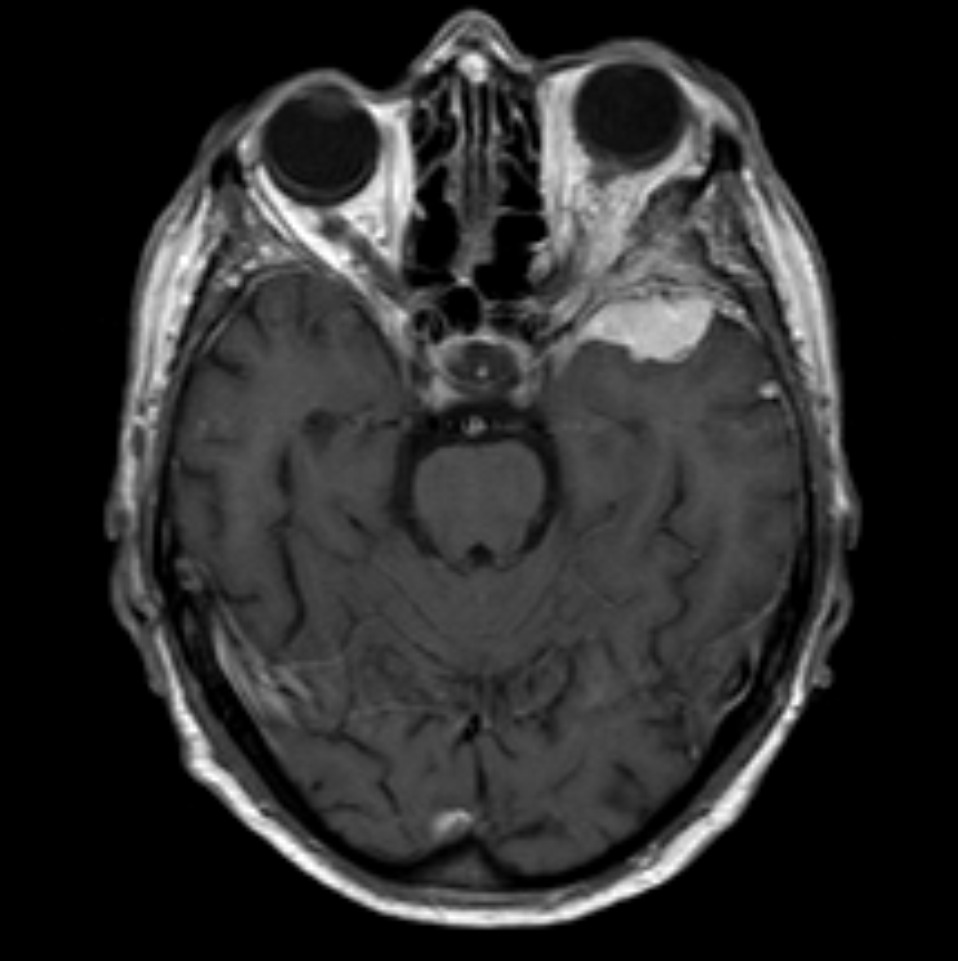
Sphenoid wing meningioma in magnetic resonance imaging (T1w contrast enhanced)

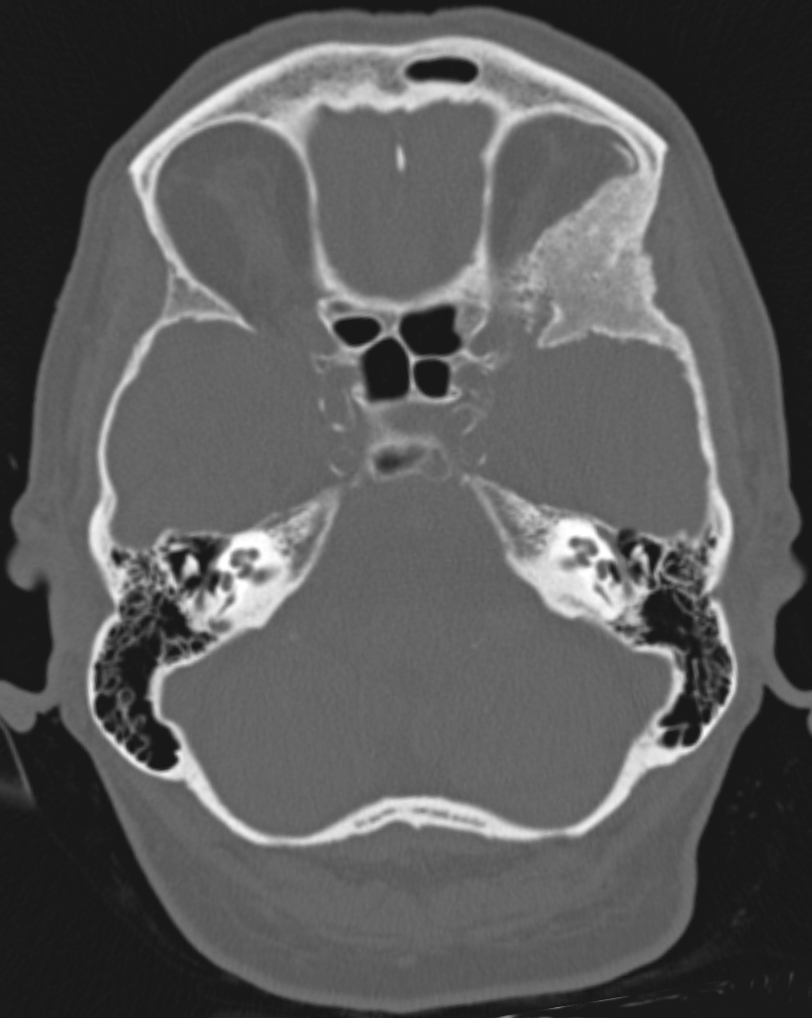
Sphenoid wing meningioma in computed tomography which shows the reactive orbital hyperostosis

A sphenoid wing meningioma is a benign brain tumor near the sphenoid bone.

== Pathogenesis ==
A meningioma is a benign brain tumor. It originates from the arachnoid (not the dura), the tissue covering the brain and spinal cord lying deep to the dura. Meningiomas are much more common in females, and are more common after 50 years of age. Of all cranial meningiomas, about 20% of them are in the sphenoid wing. In some cases, deletions involving chromosome 22 are involved.

== Diagnosis ==
Sphenoid wing meningiomas are diagnosed by the combination of suggestive symptoms from the history and physical and neuroimaging by magnetic resonance imaging (MRI) or computer averaged tomography (CT). Tumors growing in the inner wing (clinoidal) most often cause direct damage to the optic nerve leading especially to a decrease in visual acuity, progressive loss of color vision, defects in the field of vision (especially cecocentral), and an afferent pupillary defect. If the tumor continues to grow and push on the optic nerve, all vision will be lost in that eye as the nerve atrophies. Proptosis, or anterior displacement of the eye, and palpebral swelling may also occur when the tumor impinges on the cavernous sinus by blocking venous return and leading to congestion. Damage to cranial nerves in the cavernous sinus leads to diplopia. Cranial nerve VI is often the first affected, leading to diplopia with lateral gaze. If cranial nerve V-1 is damaged, the patient will have pain and altered sensation over the front and top of the head. Horner's syndrome may occur if nearby sympathetic fibers are involved.

=== Classification ===
Tumors found in the external third of the sphenoid are of two types: en-plaque and globoid meningiomas. En plaque meningiomas characteristically lead to slowly increasing proptosis with the eye angled downward. Much of this is due to reactive orbital hyperostosis. With invasion of the tumor into the orbit, diplopia is common. Patients with globoid meningiomas often present only with signs of increased intracranial pressure. This leads to various other symptoms including headache and a swollen optic disc. The differential diagnosis for sphenoid wing meningioma includes other types of tumors such as optic nerve sheath meningioma, cranial osteosarcoma, metastases, and also sarcoidosis. Following the physical exam, the diagnosis is confirmed with neuro-imaging. Either a head CT or MRI with contrast such as gadolinium is useful, as meningiomas often show homogenous enhancement. Angiography looking for signs like stretched arteries may be used to supplement evaluation of vascular involvement and to determine whether embolization would be helpful if surgery is being considered.

== Treatment ==
Meningiomas have been divided into three types based on their patterns of growth. Histological factors that increase the grade include a high number of mitotic figures, necrosis and local invasion. Treatment of sphenoid wing meningiomas often depends on the location and size of the tumor. Gamma knife radiation and microscopic surgery are common options. Their encapsulated, slow growth makes meningiomas good targets for radiosurgery. In one series, less than one-third of clinoidal meningiomas could be completely resected without unacceptable risk of damaging of blood vessels (especially the carotid artery) or cranial nerves, risks that are lower with radiosurgery. If surgery is done and the entire tumor cannot be removed, then external beam radiation helps reduce recurrence of the growth. In fact, surgery followed by radiation at recurrence provided excellent tumor control in cases where gross-total resection cannot be achieved. Most all meningiomas grow very slowly and almost never metastasize to other parts of the body. In part because of its slow growth, if a tumor is asymptomatic and found only by imaging, the best course is often observation with serial clinical exams and imaging. Possible indications for intervention would be a rapid increase in growth or involvement of cranial nerves. Untreated, one small series showed survival rates ranging from five to over twenty years, though most had unilateral blindness as well as paresis of extraocular movements.

== Prognosis ==
Higher grade tumors have been shown to correspond with higher recurrences. Depending on the grade and extent of resection, from less than 1 in 10 to over two-thirds of tumors will recur after surgical excision. Follow-up clinical exams, as well as neuroimaging, can aid in detecting recurrences. As many meningiomas have receptors for progesterone, progesterone blockers are being investigated. Two other drugs that are being studied for use are hydroxyurea and interferon alpha-2b.
