= Subependymoma =

Relatively benign brain cancer involving ependymal cells

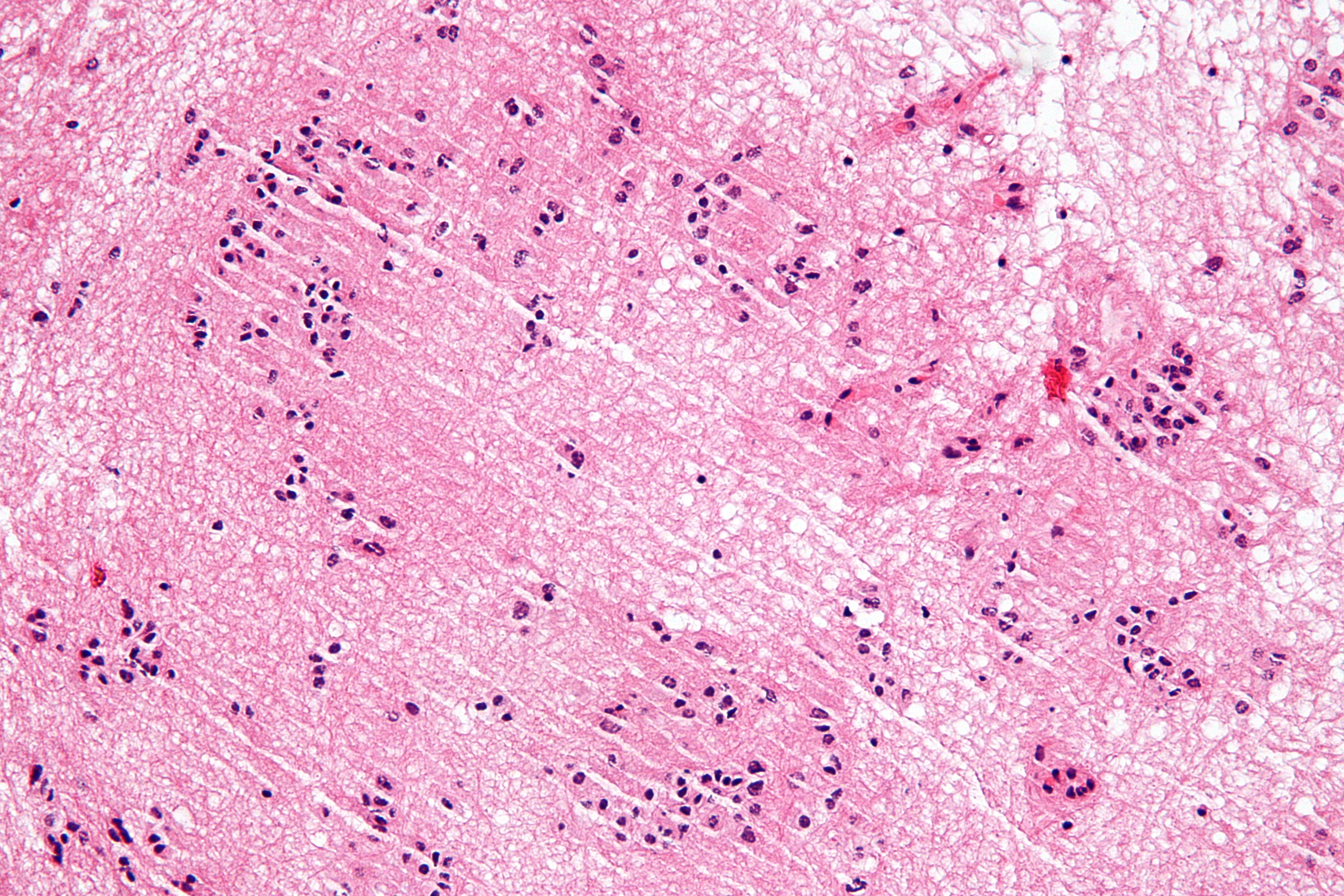
- Micrograph of a subependymoma showing the characteristic clustering of nuclei. H&E stain.
- Specialty: Neoplasms, Neuro-oncology

A subependymoma is a type of brain tumor; specifically, it is a rare form of ependymal tumor. They are usually in middle aged people. Earlier, they were called subependymal astrocytomas.

The prognosis for a subependymoma is better than for most ependymal tumors, and it is considered a grade I tumor in the World Health Organization (WHO) classification.

They are classically found within the fourth ventricle, typically have a well demarcated interface to normal tissue and do not usually extend into the brain parenchyma, like ependymomas often do.

== Symptoms and signs ==
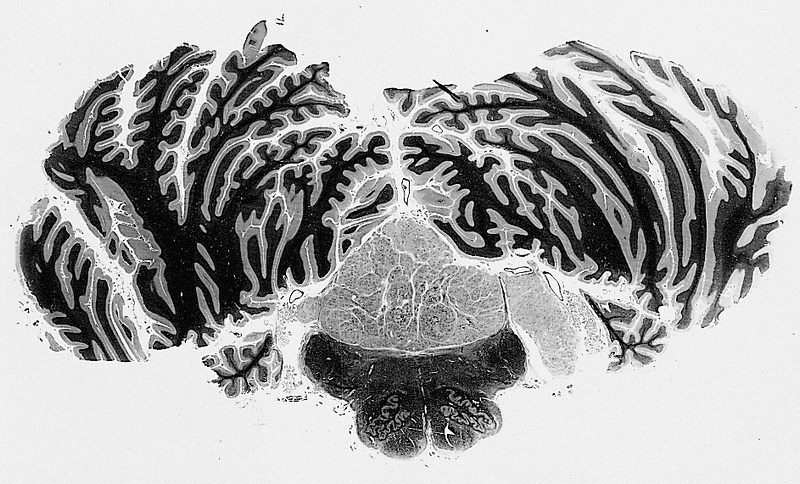
Subependymomas of the fourth ventricle, extending into the cerebellopontine angle via the foramen of Luschka, right side of illustration.

Patients are often asymptomatic, and are incidentally diagnosed. Larger tumours are often with increased intracranial pressure.

== Pathology ==
These tumours are small, no more than two centimeters across, coming from the ependyma. The best way to distinguish it from a subependymal giant cell astrocytoma is the size.

== Diagnosis ==
The diagnosis is based on tissue, e.g. a biopsy. Histologically subependymomas consistent of microcystic spaces and bland appearing cells without appreciable nuclear atypia or mitoses. The nuclei tend to form clusters.

On a CT, it often shows a less dense to equally dense mass. If it is big, it may have parts that are cystic or calcific. In 50-60% of cases, the tumor is in the fourth ventricle, while the second most common (30-40% of cases) location is the side ventricles. It is rare for it to be in the third ventricle or the central canal of the spinal cord.

== Treatment ==
Asymptomatic cases may only need watchful waiting. If symptomatic, it can be surgically removed, and partial removal also carries an excellent prognosis.

== Prognosis ==
The outlook of a cure is extremely favorable.
