= NRN1 =

Protein-coding gene in the species Homo sapiens

Identifiers
- Aliases: NRN1, NRN, dJ380B8.2, neuritin 1
- External IDs: OMIM: 607409; MGI: 1915654; GeneCards: NRN1

Gene location (Human)
Chr.	Chromosome 6 (human)
Band	6p25.1	Start	5,997,999 bp
Band	6p25.1	End	6,007,605 bp

Gene location (Mouse)
Chr.	Chromosome 13 (mouse)
Band	13|13 A3.3	Start	36,909,335 bp
Band	13|13 A3.3	End	36,919,105 bp
RNA expression pattern
Bgee	Human / Mouse (ortholog); Top expressed in: cerebellar cortex; cerebellar hemisphere; orbitofrontal cortex; dorsolateral prefrontal cortex; right frontal lobe; right hemisphere of cerebellum; ganglionic eminence; superior frontal gyrus; prefrontal cortex; cerebellar vermis / Top expressed in: habenula; piriform cortex; cumulus cell; visual cortex; primary motor cortex; primary visual cortex; dentate gyrus; prefrontal cortex; hippocampus proper; left lobe of liver; More reference expression data
BioGPS	n/a
Orthologs
Databases	NCBI: entry; OMA: entry
Species	Human	Mouse
Entrez	51299	68404
Ensembl	ENSG00000124785	ENSMUSG00000039114
UniProt	Q9NPD7	Q8CFV4
RefSeq (mRNA)	NM_001278710; NM_001278711; NM_016588	NM_153529; NM_001374754
RefSeq (protein)	NP_001265639; NP_001265640; NP_057672	NP_705757; NP_001361683
Location (UCSC)	Chr 6: 6 – 6.01 Mb	Chr 13: 36.91 – 36.92 Mb
PubMed search
- Wikidata
View/Edit Human	View/Edit Mouse

Neuritin 1 is a protein that in humans is encoded by the NRN1 gene.

== Function ==
This gene encodes a member of the neuritin family, and is expressed in postmitotic-differentiating neurons of the developmental nervous system and neuronal structures associated with plasticity in the adult. The expression of this gene can be induced by neural activity and neurotrophins. The encoded protein contains a consensus cleavage signal found in glycosylphoshatidylinositol (GPI)-anchored proteins. The encoded protein promotes neurite outgrowth and arborization, suggesting its role in promoting neuritogenesis. Overexpression of the encoded protein may be associated with astrocytoma progression. Alternative splicing results in multiple transcript variants. [provided by RefSeq, Jul 2013].
