= Gliomatosis cerebri =

- Other names: Infiltrative diffuse astrocytosis
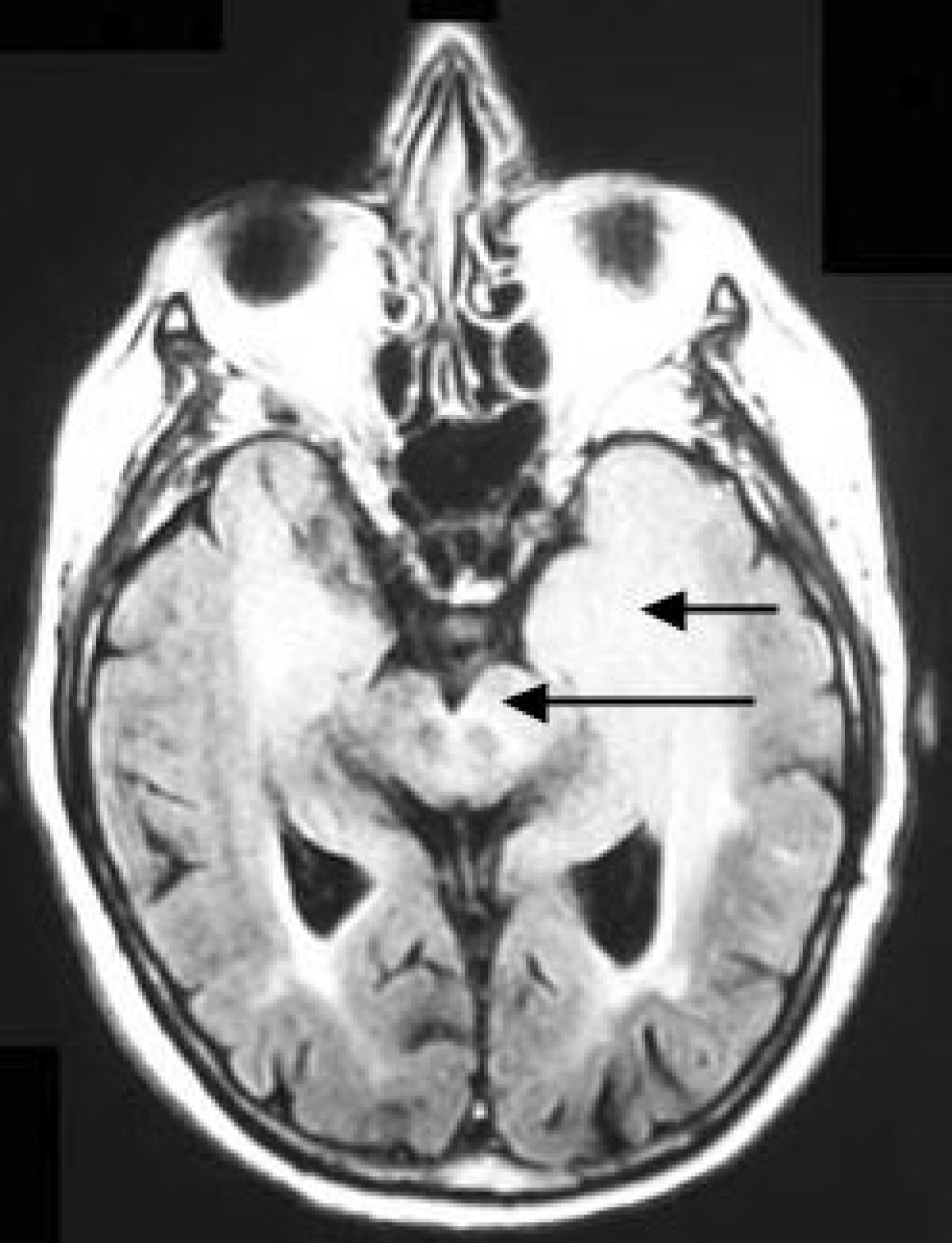
- Axial fluid-attenuated inversion recovery MRI image demonstrating tumor-related infiltration involving both temporal lobes (Short arrow), and the substantia nigra (Long arrow).
- Specialty: Neuro-oncology, Neurosurgery

Gliomatosis cerebri is a rare growth pattern of some brain tumors, impacting at least three cerebral lobes, mostly with bilateral involvement of the cerebral hemispheres. It can be seen in some types of diffuse glioma, most notably glioblastoma. It consists of infiltrative threads that spread deeply into the brain, making them very difficult to remove with surgery or treat with radiation and is associated with poor prognosis.

Previously it was considered to be a separate type of tumor, but this view has been overturned by molecular and genetic diagnostics.

== Definition ==
As defined by the WHO, gliomatosis cerebri spans at least three cerebral lobes, usually involves both hemispheres and can also spread deeply into the gray matter or into infratentorial structures like the brainstem, cerebelleum or spinal cord.

Until the 4th revision of the WHO classification of tumours of the central nervous system of 2016, gliomatosis cerebri was considered to be a distinct entity. Due to advances in molecular diagnostics, the lack of a specific genetic profile and poor prognostic value, this definition is now considered obsolete.

== Causes ==
Gliomatosis cerebri is most often caused by glioblastoma, but can also arise from astrocytoma, oligodendroglioma or other types of diffuse glioma. Other pathologies such as vasculitis, encephalitis or leukoencephalopathy may also cause similar radiological findings.
