= Fibrillary astrocytoma =

Type of brain tumor

- Other names: Low-grade or diffuse astrocytomas
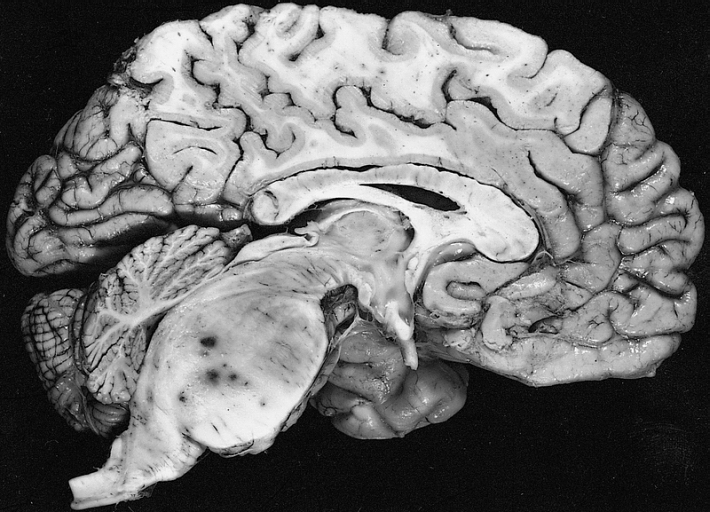
- Diffuse fibrillary astrocytomas arising in the brain stem favor the pons: The tumor here produces the classic hypertrophy of the affected region.
- Specialty: Neuro-oncology

Fibrillary astrocytomas are a type of primary slow-growing brain tumors that typically occur in adults between the ages of 20 and 50.

== Symptoms ==
Seizures, frequent mood changes, and headaches are among the earliest symptoms of the tumor. Hemiparesis, known as physical weakness on one side of the body, is also common.

== Pathology ==
Fibrillary astrocytomas arise from neoplastic astrocytes, a type of glial cell found in the central nervous system. They may occur anywhere in the brain, or even in the spinal cord, but are most commonly found in the cerebral hemispheres. As the alternative name "diffuse astrocytoma" implies, the outline of the tumour is not clearly visible in scans, because the borders of the neoplasm tend to send out tiny microscopic fibrillary tentacles that spread into the surrounding brain tissue. These tentacles intermingle with healthy brain cells, making complete surgical removal difficult. However, they are low-grade tumors, with a slow rate of growth, so patients commonly survive longer than those with otherwise similar types of brain tumours, such as glioblastoma multiforme.

== Diagnosis ==
A continuous EEG recording of the brain's electrical activity may help to identify and localize seizure activity, especially in children. CT scans and MRI scans of the brain may show the presence of a diffuse mass that fails to light up when a contrast dye is given. In some cases, a biopsy may be required to confirm the nature of the tumour.

== Treatment ==
Treatment options include surgery, radiotherapy, radiosurgery, and chemotherapy.

The infiltrating growth of microscopic tentacles in fibrillary astrocytomas makes complete surgical removal difficult or impossible without injuring brain tissue needed for normal neurological function. However, surgery can still reduce or control tumor size. Possible side effects of surgical intervention include brain swelling, which can be treated with steroids, and epileptic seizures. Complete surgical excision of low-grade tumors is associated with a good prognosis. However, the tumor may recur if the resection is incomplete, in which case further surgery or the use of other therapies may be required.

Standard radiotherapy for fibrillary astrocytoma requires 10 to 30 sessions, depending on the subtype of the tumor, and may sometimes be performed after surgical resection to improve outcomes and survival rates. Side effects include the possibility of local inflammation, leading to headaches, which can be treated with oral medication. Radiosurgery uses computer modelling to focus minimal radiation doses at the exact location of the tumour, while minimising the dose to the surrounding healthy brain tissue. Radiosurgery may be a complementary treatment after regular surgery, or it may represent the primary treatment technique.

Although chemotherapy for fibrillary astrocytoma improves overall survival, it is effective only in about 20% of cases. Researchers are currently investigating a number of promising new treatment techniques including gene therapy, immunotherapy, and novel chemotherapies.
