= Vocimagene amiretrorepvec/flucytosine =

Combination of
- Vocimagene amiretrorepvec: Gene therapy
- Flucytosine: Cancer drug

Clinical data
- Other names: Toca 511 and Toca FC

Vocimagene amiretrorepvec/flucytosine is an experimental combination drug involving a gene therapy agent and a prodrug. It is a candidate drug to treat brain cancers.

Vocimagene amiretrorepvec (also known as Toca 511) is a gene therapy agent, wherein the payload is a gene encoding cytosine deaminase (CD) in a replicating, non-lytic retroviral vector.

Flucytosine (also known as 5-fluorocytosine, 5-FC, and Toca FC) is an antifungal drug. It is used in an extended-release formulation. Flucytosine is a prodrug of 5-fluorouracil (5-FU), a cancer drug. 5-Fluorouracil does not cross the blood–brain barrier well, but flucytosine does.

The combination drug was designed to be used after a brain tumor is removed surgically; vocimagene amiretrorepvec is intended to be injected into the tissues lining the hole where the tumor was (this region is called the margin), where the virus replicates only in cells that are dividing - in other words, cancer cells left over in the margin and immune cells that are present. Flucytosine is then administered to the person, and is converted to 5-fluorouracil in those cells by CD expressed by cells that had been infected with the gene therapy vector.

By July 2017, the EMA had granted the combination priority review status, and the FDA had granted it Breakthrough Therapy Designation and FDA Fast Track designation for recurrent HGG, and an orphan designation for the treatment of glioblastoma.

The combination is under development by Tocagen and as of July 2017 phase 2/3 trials were underway for recurrent astrocytoma and recurrent high grade glioblastoma.
