= Pleomorphic anaplastic neuroblastoma =

Pleomorphic anaplastic neuroblastoma (PAN) is a striking aspect of neuroblastoma first described by Cozzutto and Carbone in 1988. Another case was thereafter reported by Cowan, et al. with cytogenetic and immunohistological analysis in a 28-year-old man. The case described by Navarro, et al. showed MYCN amplification (more than 10 copies) and a 1p36 deletion as measured with FISH in 13% of cells. Additionally there was a main cell population with a DNA index of 2 indicating a tetraploid DNA content and a high expression of MIBI (Ki-67), bel 2, p53, and P-glycoprotein, either correlated with rapid progression of disease.

== Histopathology ==
Appearance of focal or diffuse presence of pleomorphic and anaplastic cells is the hallmark of this neuroblastoma variant. Hyperchromatic and bizarre nuclei in neuroblasts and ganglion cells in undifferentiated or poorly differentiated foci are far too pathognomonic, although anaplastic expressions can be found in differentiating foci alike. Undifferentiated neuroblasts may show enlarged and vesicular nuclei with thick nuclear membranes and prominent nucleoli, often a clue to forthcoming anaplastic change.

== Controversy ==
Whether pleomorphism-anaplasia warrants a worse prognosis has not been fully assessed so far. Chatten argued that increasing anaplasia in stage IV in comparison with stage III found in her cases suggested a trend toward higher stage (and worse prognosis) with anaplasia. However, within-stage differences were not significant, although cases without anaplasia fared better in each stage than those with. Abramowsky's et al. series of 7 children with anaplastic large cell neuroblastoma showed a better survival than previously reported cases. Joshi, et al. did not find any meaningful difference in clinical outcome between cases with or without anaplasia. Dehner pointed out the importance of recognizing this variant for differential diagnostic purposes. Expressions of pleomorphism-anaplasia have been fully acknowledged among the multifarious features of neuroblastoma in the classification by the International Neuroblastoma Pathology Committee. Recently Tornòczky et al. described 7 cases of large cell neuroblastoma characterized by larger nuclei with thick nuclear membranes and prominent nucleoli suggesting they might represent a distinct phenotype of neuroblastoma with aggressive clinical behavior.
