= Anaplastic astrocytoma =

Type of brain cancer

Astrocytoma, IDH-mutant, specifically grade 3
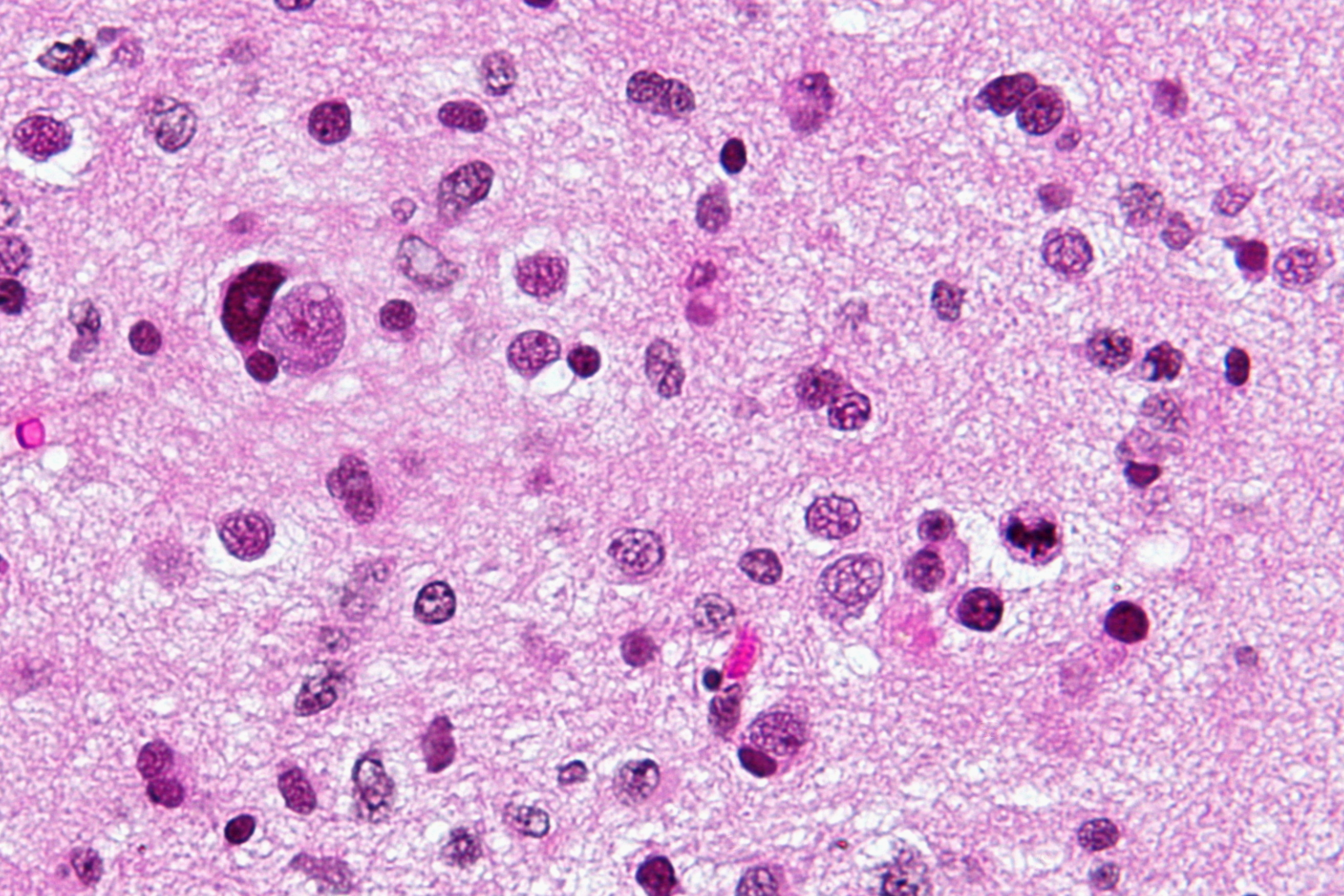
- Micrograph of an anaplastic astrocytoma. H&E stain.
- Specialty: Neuro-oncology, Neurosurgery
- Prognosis: 23.6% (5-year survival)
- Frequency: 0.0005%

Anaplastic astrocytoma is an outdated term for a rare WHO grade 3 type of IDH-mutated astrocytoma, which is a type of cancer of the brain. In the United States, the annual incidence rate for anaplastic astrocytoma is 0.35 per 100,000 people.

== Signs and symptoms ==
Patients most often present with focal or generalized symptoms, depending on the anatomic location of the tumour. Focal symptoms may include weakness, visual impairment, language dysfunction, and gait disturbance. Generalized symptoms include personality and behavioural changes, headaches, nausea, and seizures. The growth rate and mean interval between onset of symptoms and diagnosis is approximately 1.5–2 years but is highly variable, being intermediate between that of low-grade astrocytomas and glioblastomas. Seizures are less common among patients with anaplastic astrocytomas compared to low-grade lesions.

== Causes ==
The best-known risk factor is exposure to ionizing radiation, and CT scan radiation is an important cause. The dose-response for the relationship between low-dose ionizing radiation and anaplastic astrocytoma risk is a risk increase of 115% per 100 milligram of radiation. Most high-grade gliomas occur sporadically or without identifiable cause. However, a small proportion (less than 5%) of persons with malignant astrocytoma have a definite or suspected hereditary predisposition. The main hereditary predispositions are mainly neurofibromatosis type I, Li-Fraumeni syndrome, hereditary nonpolyposis colorectal cancer and tuberous sclerosis. Anaplastic astrocytomas have also been associated with previous exposure to vinyl chloride and to high doses of radiation therapy to the brain.

== Pathology ==
=== Histology ===
Anaplastic astrocytoma frequently contains mixed areas of low and high grade tumor, reflecting progression from a lower-grade precursor in three quarters of cases; the remaining quarter arise de novo. Histologically, anaplastic astrocytoma (actrocytoma, IDH-mutant, WHO grade 3) is characterized by:

- Increased cellularity and nuclear atypia
- Brisk mitotic activity (key feature distinguishing grade 3 from grade 2)
- Presence of glial markers (e.g., GFAP) and absence of neuronal markers
- Absence of microvascular proliferation and necrosis (features that, along with homozygous CDKN2A/B deletion, define grade 4)

The MIB-1 (Ki-67) labelling index is usually 5-10% but may overlap with both low-grade astrocytoma and glioblastoma, and can show considerable variation. Histologic classification alone has poor reproducibility among pathologists and correlates imperfectly with outcome; molecular classification is now considered the stronger predictor of prognosis, with the most accurate assessment achieved by combining both approaches.

=== Molecular features ===
There is no single molecular marker that defines anaplastic astrocytoma. The most important molecular alterations and their clinical significance are as follows.

==== IDH1/IDH2 mutations ====
Mutations in IDH1/IDH2 are a defining feature of the parent cancer classification, astrocytoma, IDH-mutant. IDH1 is mutated in 95% of cases. Tumors with IDH mutations are associated with significantly better outcomes than those without.

==== MGMT promoter methylation ====
Methylation of the MGMT promoter region is present in approximately 50% of cases. It is associated with improved progression-free survival.

==== Absent CDKN2A/B deletion ====
Under the 2021 WHO guidelines, presence of a CDKN2A/B deletion indicates grade 4, even in the absence of histological necrosis or microvascular proliferation.

==== Absent 1p/19q codeletion ====
By definition, the presence of 1p/19q codeletion reclassifies the tumour as oligodendroglioma, IDH-mutant and 1p/19q-codeleted, under the 2021 WHO scheme.

== Treatment ==
The standard initial treatment is to remove as much of the tumor as possible without worsening neurologic deficits. Radiation therapy has been shown to prolong survival and is a standard component of treatment. Long-term follow up confirms that radiotherapy followed by adjuvant temozolomide is effective for treating recurrent anaplastic astrocytoma.

Quality of life after treatment depends heavily on the area of the brain that housed the tumor. In many cases, patients with anaplastic astrocytoma may experience various types of paralysis, speech impediments, difficulties planning and skewed sensory perception. Most cases of paralysis and speech difficulties can be rehabilitated with speech, occupational, physical, and vision therapy.

== Prognosis ==
The age-standardized 5-year relative survival rate is 23.6%. Patients with this tumor are 46 times more likely to die than matched members of the general population. Prognosis across age groups is different especially during the first three years post-diagnosis. When the elderly population is compared with young adults, the excess hazard ratio (a hazard ratio that is corrected for differences in mortality across age groups) decreases from 10.15 to 1.85 at 1 to 3 years, meaning that the elderly population are much more likely to die in the first year post-diagnosis when compared to young adults (aged 15 to 40), but after three years, this difference is reduced markedly. Typical median survival for anaplastic astrocytoma is 2–3 years. Secondary progression to glioblastoma multiforme is common. Radiation, younger age, female sex, treatment after 2000, and surgery were associated with improved survival in AA patients.
