= Grading of the tumors of the central nervous system =

Grading of the tumors of the CNS
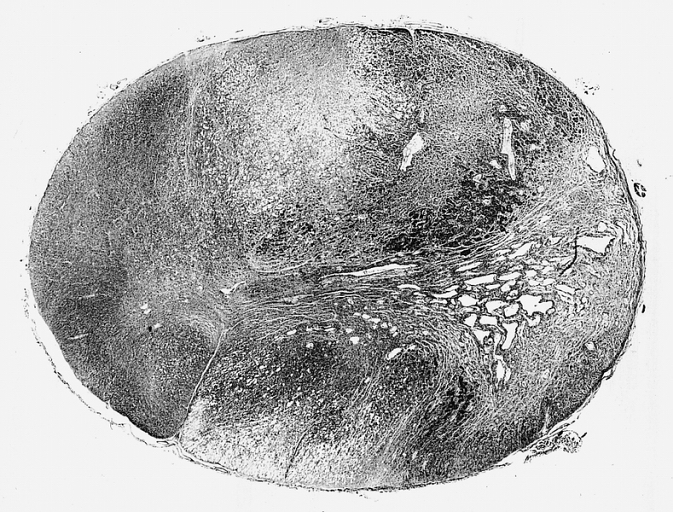
- Glioblastoma arising in an astrocytoma. This spinal cord exhibits both a lightly staining microcystic astrocytoma as well as a darkly staining glioblastoma.

The concept of grading of the tumors of the central nervous system, agreeing for such the regulation of the "progressiveness" of these neoplasias (from benign and localized tumors to malignant and infiltrating tumors), dates back to 1926 and was introduced by P. Bailey and H. Cushing, in the elaboration of what turned out the first systematic classification of gliomas.
In the following, the grading systems present in the current literature are introduced. Then, through a table, the more relevant are compared.

== ICD-O scale ==
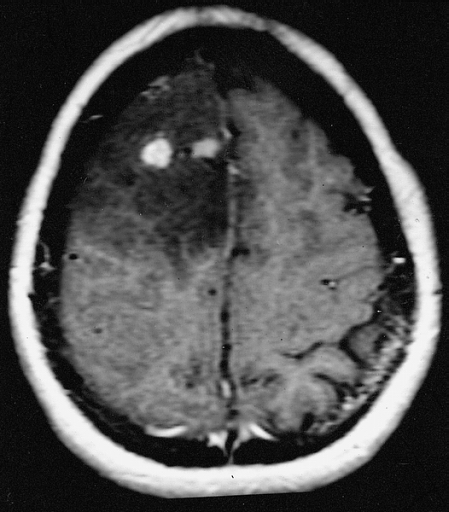
MRI of a diffuse astrocytoma with differing degrees of differentiation.

The first edition of the International Classification of Diseases (ICD) dates back to 1893. The current review (ICD-10) dates back to 1994, came into use in the U.S. in 2015, and is revised yearly, being very comprehensive.
In 1976 the World Health Organization (WHO) published the first edition of the International Classification of Diseases for Oncology (ICD-O), which is now at the third edition (ICD-O-3, 2000).
In this last edition, the Arabic numeral after the character "/" indicates the "behavior" of the neoplasia, with the following meaning:

- /0 benign neoplasia
- /1 uncertain neoplasia (benign or malignant)
- /2 neoplasia in situ
- /3 primary infiltrative malignant neoplasia
- /6 secondary malignant neoplasia
- /9 malignant neoplasia, uncertain if primitive or secondary

For the concepts of benign and malignant neoplasia see Tumor and Cancer. For primary and secondary neoplasias see Metastasis.

== Kernohan grading ==
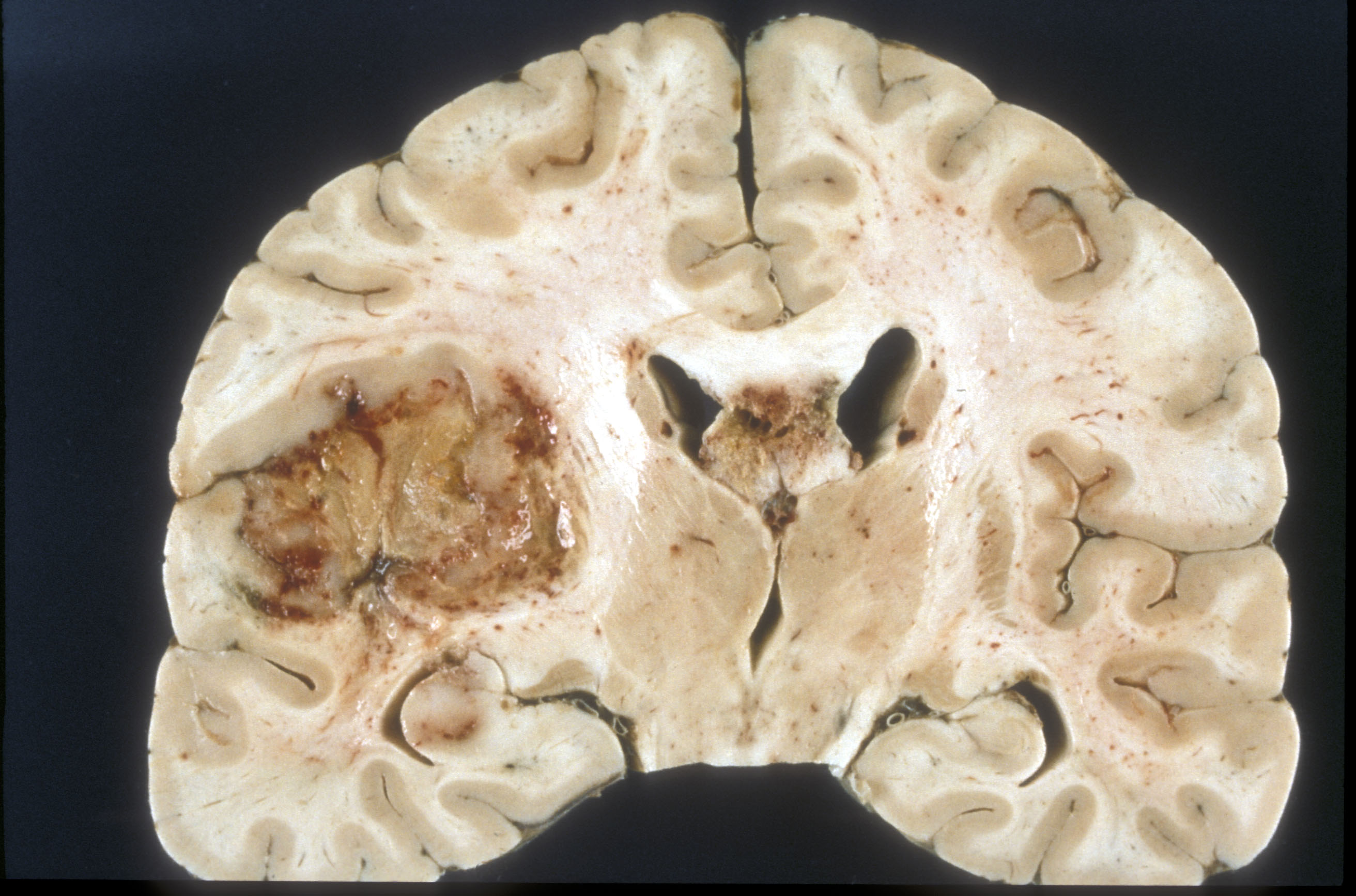
Macroscopic pathology of glioblastoma.

The Kernohan grading system defines progressive malignancy of astrocytomas as follows:

- Grade 1 tumors are benign astrocytomas.
- Grade 2 tumors are low-grade astrocytomas.
- Grade 3 tumors are anaplastic astrocytomas.
- Grade 4 tumors are glioblastomas.

== St Anne-Mayo grading ==
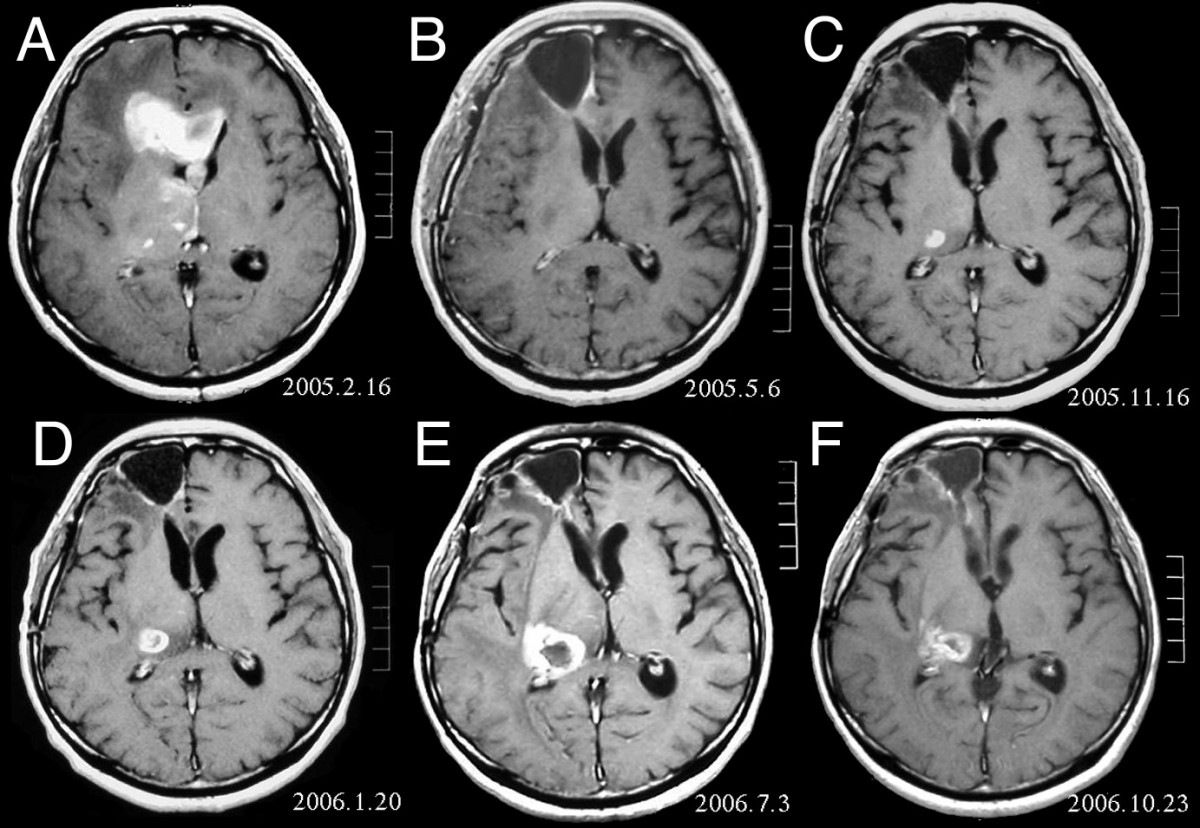
MRI of a patient with anaplastic astrocytoma.

The St Anne-Mayo grading system also is used to grade astrocytomas; however, this system uses four morphologic criteria to assign a grade:

a) nuclear atypia,
b) mitosis,
c) endothelial proliferation-'piled-up' endothelial cells. NOT hypervascularity

d) necrosis.

The St. Anne-Mayo grade has four categories of tumors:

- Grade 1 tumors do not meet any of the criteria.
- Grade 2 tumors meet one criterion, usually nuclear atypia.
- Grade 3 tumors meet two criteria, usually nuclear atypia and mitosis.
- Grade 4 tumors meet three or four of the criteria.

== WHO grading ==
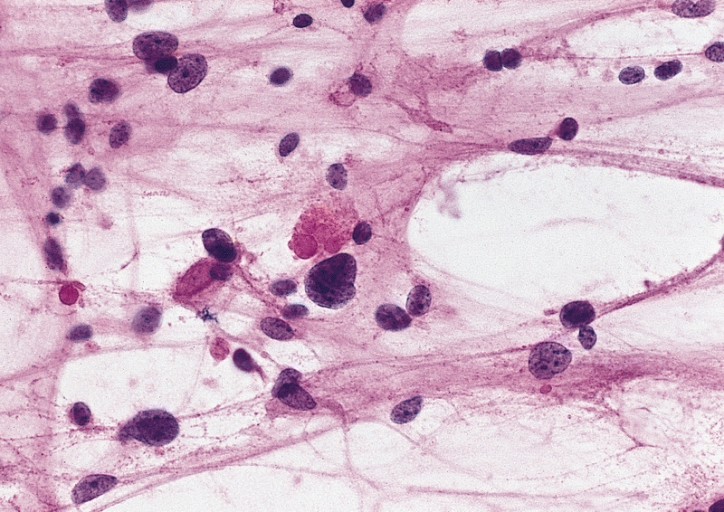
Pilocytic astrocytoma. Nuclear hyperchromasia and pleomorphism are common. Note the typical cellular elongation, and, at the center of the illustration, the eosinophilic granular body that populates pilocytic astrocytomas and certain other slowly growing gliomas.

The World Health Organization (WHO) grading system is contained in the volume Histological Typing of Tumours of the Central Nervous System, whose first edition dates back to 1979 (now up to the 5th edition, published online in 2021). The WHO grade has four categories of tumors:

- Grade 1 tumors are slow-growing, nonmalignant, and associated with long-term survival.
- Grade 2 tumors are relatively slow-growing but sometimes recur as higher grade tumors. They can be nonmalignant or malignant.
- Grade 3 tumors are malignant and often recur as higher grade tumors.
- Grade 4 tumors reproduce rapidly and are very aggressive malignant tumors.

Roman numerals (I – IV) were used until the 5th edition (2021) of the WHO classification of CNS tumors.
From the histological point of view the WHO system is based on the same criteria as the St Anne-Mayo system.

== Comparison of the grading systems ==
In the following table the various grading systems are compared (the IDC-O scale is not comprised because it is not considered a real grading system):

Nome WHO	WHO grade	Kernohan grade	St Anne/Mayo grade	St Anne/Mayo criteria
Pilocytic astrocytoma	1	-	1	0 criterion
Astrocytoma, IDH-mutant, grade 2	2	1/2	2	1 criterion (a)
Astrocytoma, IDH-mutant, grade 3	3	3	3	2 criteria (a+b)
Glioblastoma, IDH-wildtype	4	4	4	3-4 criteria (a+b[+/-c]+d)

== See also ==
- WHO classification of the tumors of the central nervous system

== Bibliography ==
- Kleihues P, Cavenee WK, eds. (2000). Pathology and genetics of tumours of the nervous system.
  World Health Organization classification of tumours. Lyon, France: IARC Press ISBN 92-832-2409-4.
- Louis DN, Ohgaki H, Wiestler OD, Cavenee WK (eds) (2007). World Health Organization Classification of Tumours of the Central Nervous System. IARC, Lyon ISBN 92-832-2430-2.
