= Bay 1436032 =

Identifiers
- IUPAC name: 3-[2-[4-(trifluoromethoxy)anilino]-1-[(1R,5R)-3,3,5-trimethylcyclohexyl]benzimidazol-5-yl]propanoic acid
- CAS Number: 1803274-65-8
- PubChem CID: 118310260
- ChemSpider: 67896518
- UNII: 8R3V6LDU0V
- ChEMBL: ChEMBL4206033

Chemical and physical data
- Formula: C_{26}H_{30}F_{3}N_{3}O_{3}
- Molar mass: 489.539 g·mol^{−1}
- 3D model (JSmol): Interactive image
- SMILES: C[C@H]1C[C@H](CC(C1)(C)C)N2C3=C(C=C(C=C3)CCC(=O)O)N=C2NC4=CC=C(C=C4)OC(F)(F)F
- InChI: InChI=1S/C26H30F3N3O3/c1-16-12-19(15-25(2,3)14-16)32-22-10-4-17(5-11-23(33)34)13-21(22)31-24(32)30-18-6-8-20(9-7-18)35-26(27,28)29/h4,6-10,13,16,19H,5,11-12,14-15H2,1-3H3,(H,30,31)(H,33,34)/t16-,19+/m0/s1; Key:RNMAUIMMNAHKQR-QFBILLFUSA-N

Bay 1436032 is an experimental anticancer drug which acts as an inhibitor of the enzyme isocitrate dehydrogenase 1. Mutations in this enzyme are often found in various types of cancer, especially leukemia. Bay 1436032 was unsuccessful in early stage clinical trials as a monotherapy, but continues to be researched in combination with other drugs.

== See also ==
- Ivosidenib
- Olutasidenib
- Vorasidenib
