= Vorasidenib =

Anti-cancer medication

Clinical data
- Trade names: Voranigo
- AHFS/Drugs.com: Monograph
- MedlinePlus: a624055
- License data: US DailyMed: Vorasidenib
- Pregnancy category: AU: D
- Routes of administration: By mouth
- ATC code: L01XM04 (WHO)

Legal status
- Legal status: AU: S4 (Prescription only); CA: ℞-only; US: ℞-only

Identifiers
- IUPAC name: 6-(6-Chloropyridin-2-yl)-2-N,4-N-bis[(2R)-1,1,1-trifluoropropan-2-yl]-1,3,5-triazine-2,4-diamine
- CAS Number: 1644545-52-7
- PubChem CID: 117817422
- IUPHAR/BPS: 10663
- DrugBank: DB17097
- ChemSpider: 64835242
- UNII: 789Q85GA8P
- KEGG: D11834
- ChEMBL: ChEMBL4279047

Chemical and physical data
- Formula: C_{14}H_{13}ClF_{6}N_{6}
- Molar mass: 414.74 g·mol^{−1}
- 3D model (JSmol): Interactive image
- SMILES: C[C@H](C(F)(F)F)NC1=NC(=NC(=N1)C2=NC(=CC=C2)Cl)N[C@H](C)C(F)(F)F
- InChI: InChI=1S/C14H13ClF6N6/c1-6(13(16,17)18)22-11-25-10(8-4-3-5-9(15)24-8)26-12(27-11)23-7(2)14(19,20)21/h3-7H,1-2H3,(H2,22,23,25,26,27)/t6-,7-/m1/s1; Key:QCZAWDGAVJMPTA-RNFRBKRXSA-N

Vorasidenib, sold under the brand name Voranigo, is an anti-cancer medication used for the treatment of certain forms of glioma. Vorasidenib is a dual mutant isocitrate dehydrogenase 1 (IDH1) and isocitrate dehydrogenase 2 (IDH2) inhibitor. In people with astrocytoma or oligodendroglioma, IDH1 and IDH2 mutations lead to overproduction of the oncogenic metabolite 2-hydroxyglutarate (2-HG), which results in impaired cellular differentiation contributing to oncogenesis. By inhibiting the IDH1 and IDH2 mutated proteins, vorasidenib inhibits the abnormal production of 2-HG thereby leading to differentiation of malignant cells and a reduction in their proliferation.

The most common adverse reactions include fatigue, headache, increased risk of COVID-19 infection, musculoskeletal pain, diarrhea, nausea, and seizures.

Vorasidenib was approved for medical use in the United States in August 2024. It is the first approval by the US Food and Drug Administration (FDA) of a systemic therapy for people with grade 2 astrocytoma or oligodendroglioma with a susceptible isocitrate dehydrogenase-1 or isocitrate dehydrogenase-2 mutation.

== Medical uses ==
Vorasidenib is indicated for the treatment of people aged twelve years of age and older with grade 2 astrocytoma or oligodendroglioma with a susceptible isocitrate dehydrogenase-1 or isocitrate dehydrogenase-2 mutation, following surgery including biopsy, sub-total resection, or gross total resection.

== Side effects ==
The most common adverse reactions include fatigue, headache, increased risk of COVID-19 infection, musculoskeletal pain, diarrhea, nausea, and seizures. The most common grade 3 or 4 laboratory abnormalities include increased alanine aminotransferase, increased aspartate aminotransferase, GGT increased, and decreased neutrophils.

== Pharmacology ==
Agios Pharmaceuticals previously developed the mIDH1 inhibitor ivosidenib and mIDH2 inhibitor enasidenib for treatment of acute myeloid leukemia (AML) with susceptible IDH1 or IDH2 mutations, respectively. However, ivosidenib and enasidenib have low brain exposure, precluding their use in gliomas. Moreover, isoform switching between IDH1 and IDH2 has been observed as a mechanism of resistance to mIDH inhibitor therapy. Vorasidenib was thus developed to improve blood-brain barrier penetration and inhibit both mIDH1/2.

== History ==
Efficacy was evaluated in 331 participants with grade 2 astrocytoma or oligodendroglioma with a susceptible isocitrate dehydrogenase-1 or isocitrate dehydrogenase-2 mutation following surgery enrolled in INDIGO (NCT04164901), a randomized, multicenter, double-blind, placebo-controlled trial. Participants were randomized 1:1 to receive vorasidenib 40 mg orally once daily or placebo orally once daily until disease progression or unacceptable toxicity. Isocitrate dehydrogenase-1 or isocitrate dehydrogenase-2 mutation status was prospectively determined by the Life Technologies Corporation Oncomine Dx Target Test. Participants randomized to placebo were allowed to cross over to vorasidenib after documented radiographic disease progression. Participants who received prior anti-cancer treatment, including chemotherapy or radiation therapy, were excluded.

== Society and culture ==
=== Legal status ===
Vorasidenib was approved for medical use in the United States in August 2024. The FDA granted the application for vorasidenib priority review, fast track, breakthrough therapy, and orphan drug designations.

In July 2025, the Committee for Medicinal Products for Human Use of the European Medicines Agency adopted a positive opinion, recommending the granting of a marketing authorization for the medicinal product Voranigo, intended for the treatment of low grade astrocytoma or oligodendroglioma with an isocitrate dehydrogenase‑1 (IDH1) R132 or isocitrate dehydrogenase-2 (IDH2) R172 mutation in people aged twelve years of age and older weighing at least 40 kilograms (88 lb). The applicant for this medicinal product is Les Laboratoires Servier.
