= Encephalocraniocutaneous lipomatosis =

- Other names: Haberland syndrome,
- Specialty: Neurology

Encephalocraniocutaneous lipomatosis (ECCL), is a rare condition primarily affecting the brain, eyes, and skin of the head and face. It is characterized by unilateral subcutaneous and intracranial lipomas, alopecia, unilateral porencephalic cysts, epibulbar choristoma and other ophthalmic abnormalities. This condition is described as sporadic because it occurs in people without a history of the disorder in their family.

It was named after Haberland and Perou who first described it.

== Signs and symptoms ==
Eighty to ninety percent of those with encephalocraniocutaneous lipomatosis are unable to produce and keep fat tissue and have multiple lipomas. Other types of growths, including jaw tumours, may also occur.

Approximately two thirds of individuals with encephalocraniocutaneous lipomatosis have intracranial and/or intraspinal lipomas. They also have an increased risk of developing a form of brain cancer known as a glioma. Other neurological issues that can occur include seizures, spasticity and variable intellectual disability. However, approximately one third of affected individuals have typical intelligence.

The most common ocular abnormality in encephalocraniocutaneous lipomatosis is a form of benign growth called a choristoma that can occur in one or both eyes. These may affect vision. Other ocular symptoms include abnormally small eyes, small pupils, iris hypoplasia, sclerocornea, hypertrophic conjunctivae, an absent macular reflex and anterior chamber anomalies. There may be eyelid colobomas and short or abnormal palpebral fissures. Skin tags often grow around the eyelids.

== Cause ==
Encephalocraniocutaneous lipomatosis can result from mutations in the FGFR1 gene, which provides instructions for making a protein called fibroblast growth factor receptor 1 (FGFR1). This receptor interacts with proteins called fibroblast growth factors (FGFs) to trigger signaling within cells. Signaling via the FGFR1 protein is involved in many critical processes, such as cell division and the regulation of cell growth and maturation. This signaling is important for the normal development and growth of several parts of the body, including the brain. In some people with ECCL, no FGFR1 gene mutation has been identified, and the cause of the disease is unknown. Other genetic changes are under study as possible causes of this condition.

== History ==
This condition was first described in 1970.

== See also ==
- Nevus psiloliparus
