= Safusidenib =

Clinical data
- Other names: AB-218; DS-1001; DS-1001b

Legal status
- Legal status: investigational

Identifiers
- IUPAC name: (E)-3-[1-[5-(2-fluoropropan-2-yl)-3-(2,4,6-trichlorophenyl)-1,2-oxazole-4-carbonyl]-3-methylindol-4-yl]prop-2-enoic acid
- CAS Number: 1898206-17-1
- PubChem CID: 130306983
- IUPHAR/BPS: 11884
- DrugBank: DB18745
- ChemSpider: 115008003
- UNII: RCK8KK7SB9
- ChEBI: CHEBI:758414
- ChEMBL: ChEMBL4651002

Chemical and physical data
- Formula: C_{25}H_{18}Cl_{3}FN_{2}O_{4}
- Molar mass: 535.78 g·mol^{−1}
- 3D model (JSmol): Interactive image
- SMILES: CC1=CN(C2=CC=CC(=C12)/C=C/C(=O)O)C(=O)C3=C(ON=C3C4=C(C=C(C=C4Cl)Cl)Cl)C(C)(C)F
- InChI: InChI=InChI=1S/C25H18Cl3FN2O4/c1-12-11-31(17-6-4-5-13(19(12)17)7-8-18(32)33)24(34)21-22(30-35-23(21)25(2,3)29)20-15(27)9-14(26)10-16(20)28/h4-11H,1-3H3,(H,32,33)/b8-7+; Key:BOOMBLZEOHXPPX-BQYQJAHWSA-N

Safusidenib is an investigational new drug that is being evaluated by AnHeart Therapeutics and the Daiichi Sankyo Company for the treatment of IDH1-mutant glioma. It is a isocitrate dehydrogenase 1 inhibitor.

== Clinical trials ==
Safusidenib is in phase 3 clinical trials for IDH1-mutant glioma.
