= Intrauterine epidermal necrosis =

- Specialty: Dermatology

Intrauterine epidermal necrosis is a cutaneous condition that is rapidly fatal, characterized by skin erosions and ulcerations only.

== See also ==
- Congenital erosive and vesicular dermatosis
- List of cutaneous conditions
