= Nevus psiloliparus =

- Specialty: Dermatology

Nevus psiloliparus is a cutaneous condition, a rare scalp anomaly characterized by a variable degree of alopecia and an excessive amount of adipose tissue.

It is the main hallmark of encephalocraniocutaneous lipomatosis (ECCL), otherwise known as Haberland syndrome.

== See also ==
- Congenital erosive and vesicular dermatosis
- List of cutaneous conditions
