= Oligoastrocytoma =

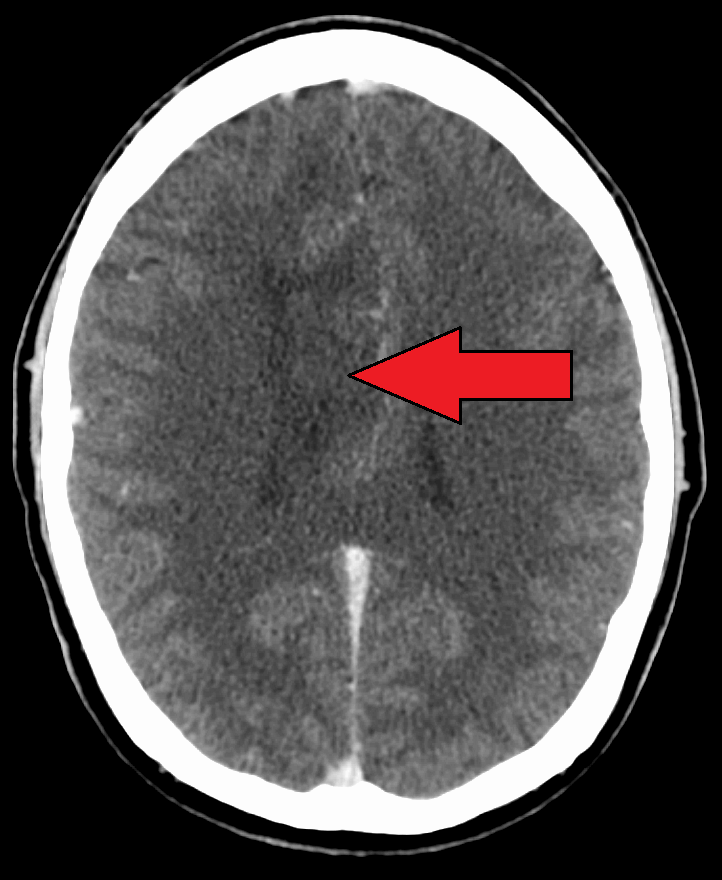
- A oligoastrocytoma on CT
- Specialty: Neuro-oncology

Oligoastrocytomas are a subset of brain tumors that present with an appearance of mixed glial cell origin, astrocytoma and oligodendroglioma. However, the term "Oligoastrocytoma" is now considered obsolete by the National Comprehensive Cancer Network, stating "the term should no longer be used as such morphologically ambiguous tumors can be reliably resolved into astrocytomas and oligodendrogliomas with molecular testing."

These types of glial cells that become cancerous are involved with insulating and regulating the activity of neuron cells in the central nervous system. Often called a "mixed glioma", about 2.3% of all reported brain tumors are diagnosed as oligoastrocytoma. The median age of diagnosis is about 42 years old. Oligoastrocytomas, like astrocytomas and oligodendrogliomas, can be divided into low-grade and anaplastic variant, the latter characterized by high cellularity, conspicuous cytologic atypism, mitotic activity, and in some cases, microvascular proliferation and necrosis.

However, lower grades can have less aggressive biology. These are largely supratentorial tumors of adulthood that favor the frontal and temporal lobes.

== Signs and symptoms ==
There are many possible symptoms of oligodendrogliomas that are similar to other gliomas, including headaches, seizures, and speech or motor changes.

== Diagnosis ==
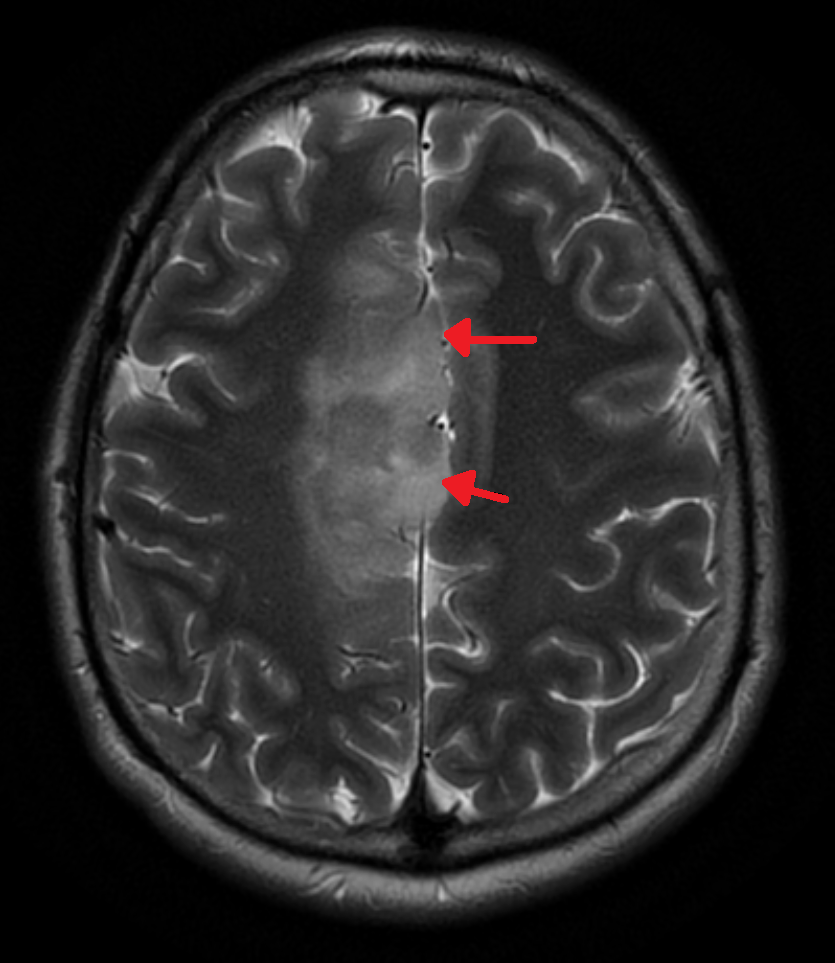
A oligoastrocytoma on MRI

An X-ray computed tomography (CT) or magnetic resonance imaging (MRI) scan is necessary to characterize the anatomy of this tumor as to size, location, and its homogeneity and heterogeneity. However, final diagnosis of this tumor, like most tumors, relies on histopathologic examination (biopsy examination).

== Treatment ==
If resected, the surgeon will remove as much of this tumor as possible without disturbing eloquent regions of the brain, such as the speech–Broca's area and Wernicke's area–and motor cortexes and other critical brain structure. Thereafter, treatment may include chemotherapy and radiation therapy of doses and types ranging based upon the patient's needs. Subsequent MRI examinations are often necessary to monitor the resection margin.

== Prognosis ==
Even after surgery, an oligoastrocytoma will often recur. The treatment for a recurring brain tumor may include surgical resection, chemotherapy, and radiation therapy. Survival time of this brain tumor varies; younger age and low-grade initial diagnosis are factors in improved survival time.
