= Crelosidenib =

Clinical data
- Other names: LY3410738

Identifiers
- IUPAC name: 7-[[(1S)-1-[4-[(1S)-2-cyclopropyl-1-(4-prop-2-enoylpiperazin-1-yl)ethyl]phenyl]ethyl]amino]-1-ethyl-4H-pyrimido[4,5-d][1,3]oxazin-2-one
- CAS Number: 2230263-60-0
- PubChem CID: 135125140
- IUPHAR/BPS: 12340
- ChemSpider: 115009279
- UNII: A4DU555RMD
- KEGG: D12708

Chemical and physical data
- Formula: C_{28}H_{36}N_{6}O_{3}
- Molar mass: 504.635 g·mol^{−1}
- 3D model (JSmol): Interactive image
- SMILES: CCN1C2=NC(=NC=C2COC1=O)N[C@@H](C)C3=CC=C(C=C3)[C@H](CC4CC4)N5CCN(CC5)C(=O)C=C
- InChI: InChI=InChI=1S/C28H36N6O3/c1-4-25(35)33-14-12-32(13-15-33)24(16-20-6-7-20)22-10-8-21(9-11-22)19(3)30-27-29-17-23-18-37-28(36)34(5-2)26(23)31-27/h4,8-11,17,19-20,24H,1,5-7,12-16,18H2,2-3H3,(H,29,30,31)/t19-,24-/m0/s1; Key:AFGYODUJVVOZAX-CYFREDJKSA-N

Crelosidenib is an investigational new drug that is being evaluated for the treatment of cancer. It acts as a selective inhibitor of isocitrate dehydrogenase 1 (IDH1), an enzyme that plays a crucial role in cellular metabolism and is frequently mutated in various cancers, including cholangiocarcinoma.
