= Isocitrate dehydrogenase 1 =

Protein found in humans

IDH1
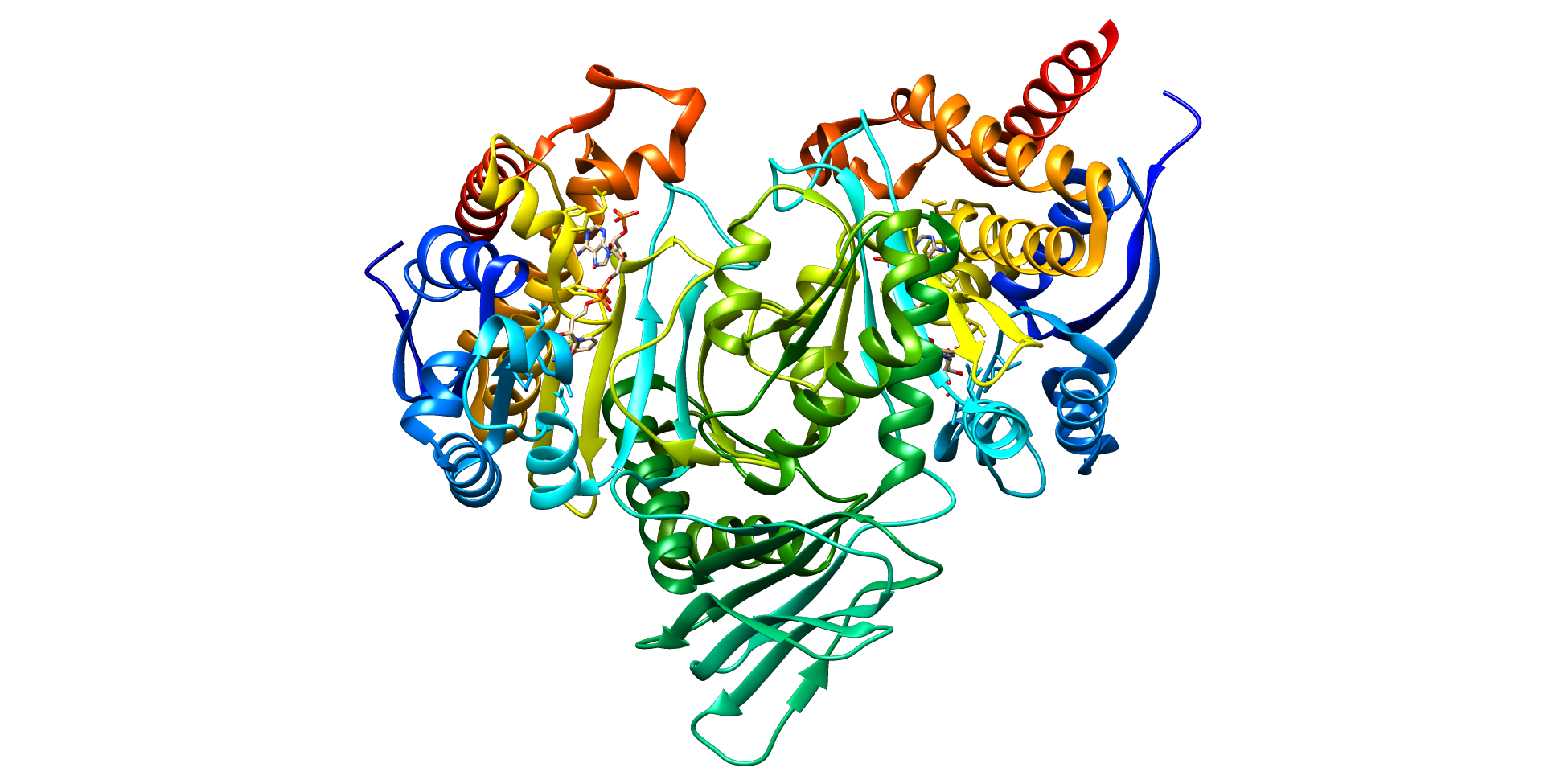

Identifiers
- Aliases: IDH1, HEL-216, HEL-S-26, IDCD, IDH, IDP, IDPC, PICD, isocitrate dehydrogenase (NADP(+)) 1, cytosolic, isocitrate dehydrogenase (NADP(+)) 1
- External IDs: OMIM: 147700; MGI: 96413; GeneCards: IDH1
Available structures
PDB	Ortholog search: PDBe RCSB
PDB	List of PDB id codes 1T09, 1T0L, 3INM, 3MAP, 3MAR, 3MAS, 4I3K, 4I3L, 4KZO, 4L03, 4L04, 4L06, 4UMX, 4UMY, 4XRX, 5DE1, 4XS3, 5K10, 5K11
Enzyme activity
EC #	BRENDA	ExPASy	KEGG	MetaCyc
1.1.1.42	↗	↗	↗	↗

Gene location (Human)
Chr.	Chromosome 2 (human)
Band	2q34	Start	208,236,229 bp
Band	2q34	End	208,266,074 bp

Gene location (Mouse)
Chr.	Chromosome 1 (mouse)
Band	1 C2- C3|1 32.91 cM	Start	65,197,775 bp
Band	1 C2- C3|1 32.91 cM	End	65,225,659 bp
RNA expression pattern
Bgee	Human / Mouse (ortholog); Top expressed in: corpus epididymis; jejunal mucosa; right adrenal cortex; mucosa of sigmoid colon; left adrenal gland; left adrenal cortex; secondary oocyte; duodenum; seminal vesicula; caput epididymis / Top expressed in: cumulus cell; transitional epithelium of urinary bladder; right kidney; medial ganglionic eminence; left lobe of liver; adrenal gland; human kidney; pyloric antrum; barrel cortex; superior cervical ganglion; More reference expression data
BioGPS	n/a
Gene ontology
Molecular function	magnesium ion binding; protein homodimerization activity; oxidoreductase activity, acting on the CH-OH group of donors, NAD or NADP as acceptor; signaling receptor binding; isocitrate dehydrogenase (NADP+) activity; oxidoreductase activity; NAD binding; isocitrate dehydrogenase activity; NADP binding; metal ion binding; (R)-2-hydroxyglutarate dehydrogenase activity; cadherin binding; identical protein binding
Cellular component	peroxisome; cytosol; extracellular exosome; peroxisomal matrix; cytoplasm; mitochondrion; extracellular region; secretory granule lumen; tertiary granule lumen; ficolin-1-rich granule lumen
Biological process	female gonad development; NADPH regeneration; response to oxidative stress; response to organic cyclic compound; response to steroid hormone; 2-oxoglutarate metabolic process; regulation of phospholipid catabolic process; isocitrate metabolic process; glyoxylate cycle; tricarboxylic acid cycle; regulation of phospholipid biosynthetic process; glutathione metabolic process; neutrophil degranulation; protein targeting to peroxisome; NADP metabolic process
Sources:Amigo / QuickGO
Orthologs
Databases	NCBI: entry; OMA: entry
Species	Human	Mouse
Entrez	3417	15926
Ensembl	ENSG00000138413	ENSMUSG00000025950
UniProt	O75874	O88844
RefSeq (mRNA)	NM_005896; NM_001282386; NM_001282387	NM_001111320; NM_010497
RefSeq (protein)	NP_001269315; NP_001269316; NP_005887	NP_001104790; NP_034627
Location (UCSC)	Chr 2: 208.24 – 208.27 Mb	Chr 1: 65.2 – 65.23 Mb
PubMed search
- Wikidata
View/Edit Human	View/Edit Mouse

Isocitrate dehydrogenase 1 (NADP+), soluble is an enzyme that in humans is encoded by the IDH1 gene on chromosome 2. Isocitrate dehydrogenases catalyze the oxidative decarboxylation of isocitrate to 2-oxoglutarate. These enzymes belong to two distinct subclasses, one of which uses NAD^{+} as the electron acceptor and the other NADP^{+}. Five isocitrate dehydrogenases have been reported: three NAD^{+}-dependent isocitrate dehydrogenases, which localize to the mitochondrial matrix, and two NADP^{+}-dependent isocitrate dehydrogenases, one of which is mitochondrial and the other predominantly cytosolic. Each NADP^{+}-dependent isozyme is a homodimer. The protein encoded by this gene is the NADP^{+}-dependent isocitrate dehydrogenase found in the cytoplasm and peroxisomes. It contains the PTS-1 peroxisomal targeting signal sequence. The presence of this enzyme in peroxisomes suggests roles in the regeneration of NADPH for intraperoxisomal reductions, such as the conversion of 2,4-dienoyl-CoAs to 3-enoyl-CoAs, as well as in peroxisomal reactions that consume 2-oxoglutarate, namely the alpha-hydroxylation of phytanic acid. The cytoplasmic enzyme serves a significant role in cytoplasmic NADPH production. Alternatively spliced transcript variants encoding the same protein have been found for this gene. [provided by RefSeq, Sep 2013]

== Structure ==
IDH1 is one of three isocitrate dehydrogenase isozymes, the other two being IDH2 and IDH3, and encoded by one of five isocitrate dehydrogenase genes, which are IDH1, IDH2, IDH3A, IDH3B, and IDH3G.

IDH1 forms an asymmetric homodimer in the cytoplasm and carries out its function through two hydrophilic active sites formed by both protein subunits. Each subunit or monomer is composed of three domains: a large domain (residues 1–103 and 286–414), a small domain (residues 104–136 and 186–285), and a clasp domain (residues 137 to 185). The large domain contains a Rossmann fold, while the small domain forms an α/β sandwich structure, and the clasp domain folds as two stacked double-stranded anti-parallel β-sheets. A β-sheet joins the large and small domains and is flanked by two clefts on opposite sides. The deep cleft, also known as the active site, is formed by the large and small domains of one subunit and a small domain of the other subunit. This active site includes the NADP-binding site and the isocitrate-metal ion-binding site. The shallow cleft, also referred to as the back cleft, is formed by both domains of one subunit and participates in the conformational changes of homodimeric IDH1. Finally, the clasp domains of both subunits intertwine to form a double layer of four-stranded anti-parallel β-sheets linking together the two subunits and the two active sites.

Furthermore, conformational changes to the subunits and a conserved structure at the active site affect the activity of the enzyme. In its open, inactive form, the active site structure forms a loop while one subunit adopts an asymmetric open conformation and the other adopts a quasi-open conformation. This conformation enables isocitrate to bind the active site, inducing a closed conformation that also activates IDH1. In its closed, inactive form, the active site structure becomes an α-helix that can chelate metal ions. An intermediate, semi-open form features this active site structure as a partially unraveled α-helix.

There is also a type 1 peroxisomal targeting sequence at its C-terminal that targets the protein to the peroxisome.

== Function ==
As an isocitrate dehydrogenase, IDH1 catalyzes the reversible oxidative decarboxylation of isocitrate to yield α-ketoglutarate (α-KG) as part of the TCA cycle in glucose metabolism. IDH1 interacts with isocitrate and a divalent metal ion cofactor, typically Mg^{2+} or Mn^{2+}, which plays a crucial role in stabilizing the negatively charged intermediates formed during the enzymatic reaction. It undergoes oxidation at the hydroxyl group on the C2 carbon, a reaction that removes electrons and produces oxalosuccinate. During this step, NAD(P)+ acts as an electron acceptor, transforming into NAD(P)H by gaining these electrons. Subsequently, oxalosuccinate undergoes decarboxylation, meaning it loses a carbon dioxide molecule, resulting in the formation of α-ketoglutarate. This step also allows for the concomitant reduction of nicotinamide adenine dinucleotide phosphate (NADP+) to reduced nicotinamide adenine dinucleotide phosphate (NADPH). Since NADPH and α-KG function in cellular detoxification processes in response to oxidative stress, IDH1 also indirectly participates in mitigating oxidative damage. In addition, IDH1 is key to β-oxidation of unsaturated fatty acids in the peroxisomes of liver cells. IDH1 also participates in the regulation of glucose-induced insulin secretion. Notably, IDH1 is the primary producer of NADPH in most tissues, especially in brain. Within cells, IDH1 has been observed to localize to the cytoplasm, peroxisome, and endoplasmic reticulum.

Under hypoxic conditions, IDH1 catalyzes the reverse reaction of α-KG to isocitrate, which contributes to citrate production via glutaminolysis. Isocitrate can also be converted into acetyl-CoA for lipid metabolism.

=== Mutation ===
IDH1 mutations are heterozygous, typically involving an amino acid substitution in the active site of the enzyme in codon 132. These mutations are somatic, meaning they primarily occur in cells that can become cancerous, such as those in brain and bone tumors. The mutation results in a loss of normal enzymatic function and the abnormal production of 2-hydroxyglutarate (2-HG). It has been considered to take place due to a change in the binding site of the enzyme. 2-HG has been found to inhibit enzymatic function of many alpha-ketoglutarate dependent dioxygenases, including histone and DNA demethylases, causing widespread changes in histone and DNA methylation and potentially promoting tumorigenesis.

== Clinical significance ==
Mutations in this gene have been shown to cause metaphyseal chondromatosis with aciduria.

Mutations in IDH1 are also implicated in cancer. Originally, mutations in IDH1 were detected in an integrated genomic analysis of human glioblastoma multiforme. Since then it has become clear that mutations in IDH1 and its homologue IDH2 are among the most frequent mutations in diffuse gliomas, including diffuse astrocytoma, anaplastic astrocytoma, oligodendroglioma, anaplastic oligodendroglioma, oligoastrocytoma, anaplastic oligoastrocytoma, and secondary glioblastoma. Mutations in IDH1 are often the first hit in the development of diffuse gliomas, suggesting IDH1 mutations as key events in the formation of these brain tumors. Glioblastomas with a wild-type IDH1 gene have a median overall survival of only 1 year, whereas IDH1-mutated glioblastoma patients have a median overall survival of over 2 years. Tumors of various tissue types with IDH1/2 mutations show improved responses to radiation and chemotherapy. The best-studied mutation in IDH1 is R132H, which has been shown to act as a tumor suppressor.

The IDH1 R132H mutation is a crucial prognostic indicator in glioma, frequently arising in the early stages of tumor development. It is predominantly found in low-grade gliomas (WHO Grades II and III) and secondary glioblastomas, which originate from the progression of lower-grade gliomas. Its presence is commonly linked to improved survival rates compared to IDH wild-type gliomas.

In its wild-type form, the IDH1 enzyme is active in the cytoplasm and peroxisomes, where it catalyzes the conversion of isocitrate into α-ketoglutarate (α-KG) as part of the citric acid cycle. This process generates NADPH, a vital molecule that supports antioxidant defenses and biosynthetic processes.

When mutated, IDH1 undergoes a neomorphic transformation, shifting its function. The altered enzyme converts α-KG into D-2-hydroxyglutarate (D-2HG), an oncometabolite. Elevated D-2HG levels disrupt normal cellular processes by inhibiting α-KG–dependent dioxygenases, leading to epigenetic changes, DNA hypermethylation, and impaired differentiation. Moreover, the mutation redirects NADPH consumption, increasing oxidative stress, which further drives tumor development.

The accumulation of D-2HG and elevated oxidative stress play a critical role in reshaping the tumor microenvironment, positioning the R132H mutation as a prime target for IDH inhibitors. These therapies aim to restore regular metabolic functions and reduce tumor aggressiveness, offering a promising avenue for glioma treatment.

In addition to being mutated in diffuse gliomas, IDH1 has also been shown to harbor mutations in human acute myeloid leukemia.

The IDH1 mutation is considered a driver alteration and occurs early during tumorigenesis, in specific in glioma and glioblastoma multiforme, its possible use as a new tumour-specific antigen to induce antitumor immunity for the cancer treatment has recently been prompted. A tumour vaccine can stimulate the body's immune system, upon exposure to a tumour-specific peptide antigen, by activation or amplification of a humoral and cytotoxic immune response targeted at the specific cancer cells.

The study of Schumacher et al. has been shown that this attractive target (the mutation in the isocitrate dehydrogenase 1) from an immunological perspective represents a potential tumour-specific neoantigen with high uniformity and penetrance and could be exploited by immunotherapy through vaccination. Accordingly, some patients with IDH1-mutated gliomas demonstrated spontaneous peripheral CD4+ T-cell responses against the mutated IDH1 region with generation B-cell producing antibodies. Vaccination of MHC-humanized transgenic mice with mutant IDH1 peptide induced an IFN-γ CD4+ T-helper 1 cell response, indicating an endogenous processing through MHC class II, and production of antibodies targeting mutant IDH1. Tumour vaccination, both prophylactic and therapeutic, resulted in growth suppression of transplanted IDH1-expressing sarcomas in MHC-humanized mice. This in vivo data shows a specific and potent immunologic response in both transplanted and existing tumours.

=== As a drug target ===
Mutated and normal forms of IDH1 had been studied for drug inhibition both in silico and in vitro.

=== Ivosidenib ===
Ivosidenib was approved by the US Food and Drug Administration (FDA) in July 2018, for relapsed or refractory acute myeloid leukemia (AML) with an IDH1 mutation. Ivosidenib (AG-120) has exhibited potent anti-wtIDH1 properties in melanoma under low magnesium and nutrient levels, reflective of the tumor microenvironment in natura. Vorasidenib was approved for medical use in the United States in August 2024. Vorasidenib is the first approval by the FDA of a systemic therapy for people with grade 2 astrocytoma or oligodendroglioma with a susceptible isocitrate dehydrogenase-1 or isocitrate dehydrogenase-2 mutation.

Ivosidenib is a highly selective, small-molecule inhibitor designed to target the mutant IDH1 enzyme. It works by reversibly inhibiting the mutated enzyme, effectively reducing the production of the oncometabolite D-2-hydroxyglutarate (D-2HG). By lowering D-2HG levels, ivosidenib helps restore normal cellular differentiation that is often disrupted in IDH1-mutant cancers, such as acute myeloid leukemia (AML) and cholangiocarcinoma.

This therapeutic approach is based on the idea that altering the D-2HG concentration interferes with both cellular metabolism and epigenetic regulation, processes that are key to the cancerous transformation driven by IDH1 mutations. Specifically, ivosidenib targets IDH1 mutations at the R132 residue, particularly the R132H and R132C variants, which are among the most common in human cancers.

In in vitro studies, ivosidenib has been shown to inhibit mutant IDH1 at significantly lower concentrations than it does the wild-type enzyme. This high level of specificity minimizes the impact on normal metabolic processes, enhancing its therapeutic efficacy while reducing off-target effects. The drug's targeted action offers promise for personalized cancer treatment by addressing the underlying metabolic disruptions caused by IDH1 mutations.

Clinical trials have demonstrated that ivosidenib is effective in improving outcomes for patients with IDH1-mutant cancers, and its ability to reduce D-2HG levels is a critical component of its mechanism of action.

=== Other approved drugs ===
Olutasidenib and vorasidenib are both IDH1 inhibitors that have been approved for treating AML and glioma respectively.

=== Investigational new drugs ===
Safusidenib, selective IDH1 inhibitor that is being developed for glioma.
