= Neuro-oncology =

Field of study

- Focus: Cancerous brain tumors
- Significant tests: Tumor markers, TNM staging, CT scans, MRI
- Specialist: Neurooncologist

Neuro-oncology is the study of brain and spinal cord neoplasms, many of which are (at least eventually) very dangerous and life-threatening (astrocytoma, glioma, glioblastoma multiforme, ependymoma, pontine glioma, and brain stem tumors are among the many examples of these). Among the malignant brain cancers, gliomas of the brainstem and pons, glioblastoma multiforme, and high-grade (highly anaplastic) astrocytoma/oligodendroglioma are among the worst. In these cases, untreated survival usually amounts to only a few months, and survival with current radiation and chemotherapy treatments may extend that time from around a year to a year and a half, possibly two or more, depending on the patient's condition, immune function, treatments used, and the specific type of malignant brain neoplasm. Surgery may in some cases be curative, but, as a general rule, malignant brain cancers tend to regenerate and emerge from remission easily, especially highly malignant cases. In such cases, the goal is to excise as much of the mass (tumor cells) and as much of the tumor margin as possible without endangering vital functions or other important cognitive abilities. The Journal of Neuro-Oncology is the longest continuously published journal in the field and serves as a leading reference to those practicing in the area of neuro-oncology.

== General information ==
=== Primary tumors of the central nervous system ===
Primary brain tumors can occur at any age, from infancy to late in life. These tumors often afflict people during their prime years. Factors such as age, tumor location, and clinical presentation are helpful in differential diagnosis. Most types of primary brain tumors are more common in men with the exception of meningiomas, which are more common in women.

Human Central Nervous System

=== Metastatic tumors of the central nervous system ===
Cancer spreads to the nervous system by direct invasion, compression, or metastasis. Direct invasion or compression from continuous tissues relates to the proximity of the nervous system to other structures, such as the brachial plexus, lumbosacral plexus, vertebral neuroforamina, base of skull, cranium, and pelvic bones.

==== Intracranial metastasis ====
There are three types of intracranial metastasis: brain metastasis, dural metastasis, and leptomeningeal metastasis. Brain metastasis can be single or multiple and involve any portion of the brain. Metastasis to dural structures generally occurs by hematogenous spread or direct invasion from a contiguous bone. Dural metastases can invade the underlying brain and cause focal edema and associated neurologic symptoms. These processes tend to cause seizures early in the course because of their cortical location. Metastasis to the leptomeninges is an uncommon but well-recognized clinical presentation in cancer patients. Leptomeningeal metastasis most commonly is due to breast, lung, or melanoma primary tumors.

==== Skull metastasis ====
Metastases to the skull are divided into two categories by general site: calvarium and skull base. Metastases to the calvarium usually are asymptomatic. Metastases to the skull base quickly become symptomatic because of their proximity to cranial nerves and vascular structures.

==== Spinal metastasis ====
The spine most often is affected by metastatic disease involving the epidural space. This usually occurs as direct tumor spread from a vertebral body (85%) or by invasion of paravertebral masses through a neuroforamin (10–15%).

== Mechanisms ==
=== Tumor factors ===
==== Histology ====
Seizures are common in patients with low-grade tumors such as dysembryoblastic neuroepithelial tumors, gangligliomas, and oligodendrogliomas. The rapid growth of fast-growing high-grade brain tumors may damage the subcortical network essential for electrical transmission, whereas slow-growing tumors have been suggested to induce partial deafferentation of cortical regions, causing denervation hypersensitivity and producing an epileptogenic milieu. Studies strongly suggest that genetic factors may play a role in tumor development and tumor-related epilepsy.

==== Glutamate neurotransmission ====
Recent work has demonstrated a close link between seizure activity and high extracellular glutamate in tumor-related epilepsy. Glutamate activation of ionotropic receptors leads to a rapid excitatory signal based on cation influx that can cause release of calcium from intracellular stores.

== Initial patient evaluation and care ==
1. Brain Tumor Presentations

In general, patients with primary brain tumors or single metastatic tumors can present with any of these signs and symptoms, whereas patients with multiple brain metastases tend to present with generalized symptoms and may lack localized findings.

Several clinical features warrant special comment:

- Seizures (partial or generalized) are the presenting symptom in 15-20% of patients with intracranial tumors. Seizures occur in up to 50% of patients with melanoma metastases, oligodendrogliomas, and tumors that have a hemorrhagic component. Seizures also are more common with cortically based tumors.
- Seizures are much less common in patients with infratentorial tumors than in those with supratentorial tumors.
- "Stroke-like" onset of symptoms is due to hemorrhage within the tumor or, less commonly, macroscopic tumor embolus from systemic cancer.
- Although intratumoral hemorrhage can occur in any primary or metastatic brain tumor, certain tumors have a greater tendency to bleed, including metastasis from melanoma, choriocarcinoma, and thyroid cancer and the primary brain tumors glioblastoma and oligodendroglioma.

2. Spinal Cord Tumor Presentations

- Pain is the first symptom in >90% of patients presenting with epidural metastasis and occurs less frequently with intradural tumors.
- Mechanisms of pain include spinal cord ischemia and traction on the periosteum, dura, nearby soft tissues, and nerve roots.
- Pain occasionally can be absent in adults and more often is absent in childhood. If other neurologic symptoms suggestive of myelopathy are present, without pain, the clinician should evaluate for spinal cord tumor.
- Changes in bowel and bladder habits, particularly urinary retention with overflow incontinence, usually occur late in the course of epidural spinal cord compression but are seen in a small percentage of patients at presentation.

3. Approach to the Evaluation of New Patients

The initial evaluation of a patient with a newly diagnosed tumor of the nervous system is a critical step toward appropriate management and patient care. The most important portions of the initial evaluation are a detailed history and a thorough examination. This process serves to identify the extent and nature of neurological deficit, provides diagnostic clues, can help disclose a source of metastasis, or may identify a genetic process associated with a primary central nervous system tumor.

4. Practical Strategies for Providing Appropriate Patient Care

There is no question that the clinical management of neurooncology patients is challenging. However, if we are to help patients and ultimately make advances in treating these tumors, meticulous and compassionate care of patients with neurological malignancies are crucial.

- Give instructions both orally and in written form for the patient to take home.
- Use a consistent format of written instructions, so that a patient can expect where to find information on the page.
- Write down new or important diagnoses for the patient to refer to at home.
- Identify one reliable caregiver to serve as a contact point.
- Pictures and diagrams are helpful.
- A team approach, using clinicians with different areas of expertise, is helpful.
- Provide a reliable and simple method for the patient to seek help.
- Minimize sedating drug use.

== Diagnostic procedures ==
=== Diagnostic imaging of the brain and spinal cord ===
The imaging studies commonly used in neurooncology are computed tomography (CT) and magnetic resonance imaging (MRI). Less commonly used are myelography, positron emission tomography (PET), and diagnostic angiography.

=== Lumbar puncture and cerebrospinal fluid analysis ===
Lumbar puncture (LP) and cerebrospinal fluid (CSF) analysis are important for the evaluation of some primary tumors, metastatic conditions, and neurologic complications of cancer.

=== Pathologic diagnosis ===
Accurate histologic diagnosis is critical for treatment planning and patient counseling. Surgically obtained tissue usually is required to make a histologic diagnosis. For certain tumors, a definitive diagnosis can be accomplished by vitreous aspirate, cerebrospinal fluid (CSF) cytology, or suggested by the presence of certain tumor markers in the CSF.

== Commonly used treatments ==
1. Radiotherapy
  Radiotherapy is an important treatment for central nervous system tumors and has been demonstrated to extend survival and improve the quality of life for patients with many of the primary and metastatic brain tumors.
2. Chemotherapy
  Chemotherapy, or the use of drugs in the treatment of cancer, can lead to the long-term control of many malignancies. Some tumors, such as testicular cancer of Hodgkin's disease, may be cured even when they are widespread. As chemotherapy may be associated with severe toxicity, it should be given under the supervision of one skilled in the administration and monitoring of such agents.
3. Corticosteroids
  Corticosteroids (CS) are commonly used in patients with a variety of neuro-oncologic conditions. CS treatment often is required to control symptoms related to increased intracranial pressure (ICP) or peritumoral edema.
4. Neurosurgical interventions
  Neurosurgical intervention is warranted in almost all cases of primary central nervous system tumors and for many metastatic tumors. A biopsy usually establishes a definitive histologic diagnosis. The role of surgery depends on the nature of the tumor. With modern neurosurgical techniques, most patients with extra-axial brain tumors are cured with minimal residual neurologic deficit.
