= Olutasidenib =

Anticancer drug

Clinical data
- Trade names: Rezlidhia
- Other names: FT-2102
- License data: US DailyMed: Olutasidenib
- Routes of administration: By mouth
- ATC code: L01XM03 (WHO)

Legal status
- Legal status: US: ℞-only

Identifiers
- IUPAC name: 5-{[(1S)-1-(6-chloro-2-oxo-1H-quinolin-3-yl)ethyl]amino}-1-methyl-6-oxo-1H-pyridine-2-carbonitrile
- CAS Number: 1887014-12-1
- PubChem CID: 118955396
- IUPHAR/BPS: 10319
- DrugBank: DB16267
- ChemSpider: 72380144
- UNII: 0T4IMT8S5Z
- KEGG: D12483
- ChEMBL: ChEMBL4297610
- PDB ligand: PWV (PDBe, RCSB PDB)

Chemical and physical data
- Formula: C_{18}H_{15}ClN_{4}O_{2}
- Molar mass: 354.79 g·mol^{−1}
- 3D model (JSmol): Interactive image
- SMILES: C[C@H](Nc1ccc(C#N)n(C)c1=O)c1cc2cc(Cl)ccc2[nH]c1=O
- InChI: InChI=InChI=1S/C18H15ClN4O2/c1-10(21-16-6-4-13(9-20)23(2)18(16)25)14-8-11-7-12(19)3-5-15(11)22-17(14)24/h3-8,10,21H,1-2H3,(H,22,24)/t10-/m0/s1; Key:NEQYWYXGTJDAKR-JTQLQIEISA-N

Olutasidenib, sold under the brand name Rezlidhia, is an anticancer medication used to treat relapsed or refractory acute myeloid leukemia with a susceptible IDH1 mutation. Olutasidenib is an isocitrate dehydrogenase-1 (IDH1) inhibitor. It is taken by mouth.

The most common adverse reactions include nausea, fatigue/malaise, arthralgia, constipation, leukocytosis, dyspnea, fever, rash, mucositis, diarrhea, and transaminitis.

Olutasidenib was approved for medical use in the United States in December 2022, based on the phase 1 results of a phase 1/2 trial.

== Medical uses ==
Olutasidenib is indicated for the treatment of adults with relapsed or refractory acute myeloid leukemia with a susceptible isocitrate dehydrogenase-1 (IDH1) mutation as detected by an FDA-approved test.

== Society and culture ==
=== Names ===
Olutasidenib is the international nonproprietary name.
