= CNS metastasis =

Spreading of cancer cells

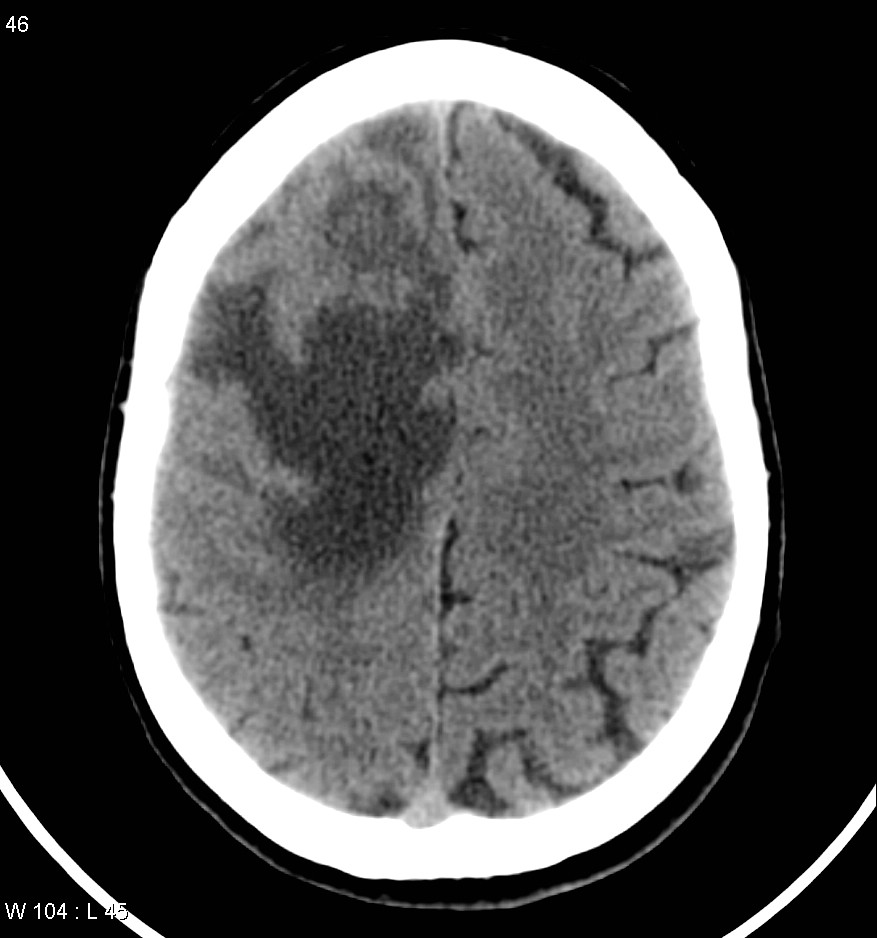
Brain CT scan showing CNS metastasis from the breast, the primary source.

CNS metastasis is the spread and proliferation of cancer cells from their original tumour to form secondary tumours in portions of the central nervous system.

The process of tumour cells invading distant tissue is complex and obscure, but modern technology has permitted an enhanced detection of metastasis. Currently, the diagnosis of central nervous system, or CNS, metastasis involves high-scale imaging to produce high-definition images of internal organs for analysis. This aids doctors and clinicians in prescribing suitable therapeutic methods, though there is no perfect treatment or preventive measure yet.

== Mechanism ==
Cancer cells spread by intravasation.

CNS metastasis is the spread and proliferation of cancer cells from their original tumour to form secondary tumours in portions of the CNS. Typically, this progression begins when tumour cells separate from the primary tumour and enter the bloodstream or the lymph system via intravasation. Intravasation into the circulatory system allows tumour cells to travel and colonise distant sites, such as the brain, a major structure of the CNS, forming a secondary brain tumour. However, CNS metastasis occurs only when genetically unstable cancers adapt to the CNS environment, which is foreign to the tumour and dissimilar from the original tumour. Subsequently, metastasised cells assume new genomic phenotypes while dropping unfavourable characteristics once they disassociate from the primary lesion. This is particularly crucial for the formation of CNS metastasis, as tumour cells require characteristics that favour the disruption of the blood-brain barrier, allowing them to transverse.

Recent evidence demonstrates that the dissemination of cells from the primary tumour is not sequential but consists of overlapping processes and routes. This includes the tumour cells invading and colluding with tissue stroma while adapting to evade immune surveillance by suppressive inhibition of regular cellular anti-tumourigenic properties. These cancerous cells modulate the foreign-tissue environment as they evolve to adapt to therapeutic interventions.

Any systemic tumour can progress towards CNS metastasis. Up to 30% of adult cancer cases harbour CNS metastasis, although this statistic is reportedly underdiagnosed because of the fallibility of medical diagnostic methods. Clinically, the majority of diagnosed CNS metastasis are derived from well-known primary tumours, while still about 5-10% are from unknown sources. Since most cancers can progress towards CNS metastasis despite multimodal treatments, it is a significant risk for patients with systemic cancer.

== Symptoms ==
Metastasis occurrence indicates stage 4 cancer progression and carries a poor prognosis. Cancer usually causes numerous and varying symptoms at this stage, depending on the underlying cancer and metastasis location. Importantly for diagnosis, a symptomatic primary lesion is localised through either surgery or radiation. Notably, CNS metastasis may occur in the brain, spinal cord, leptomeninges, epidural space, or even the dura singly or in combination. Patients are often asymptomatic with several neurological manifestations depending on tumour size and location. Clinically, CNS metastasis is known to cause haemorrhage or obstruction in the cranial portion of the CNS, leading to hydrocephalus.

Additionally, metastatic lesions are usually discrete within the brain and appear as spherical masses that displace the brain parenchyma rather than invade surrounding tissues. Generally, other symptoms include cystic degeneration, necrosis, and CNS haemorrhage, commonly within the brain. These conditions lead to the long-term degradation of neurocognition, speech, coordination, and behaviour, thereby altering patients' quality of life.

== Risk factors ==
Since CNS metastasis is the pathway of the natural progression of primary cancers, hence, main risk factors include modifiers of cancer risk. These modifiers include the accumulation of genetic, epigenetic, and environmental factors resulting in chromosomal and genomic aberrations and instability. Research has demonstrated that 80-90% of malignant tumours are caused by external environmental factors such as carcinogens.

Clinically, research evidence demonstrated that the primary tumours that have the greatest association with brain metastasis consist of lung, breast, melanoma, and colon cancers. Despite knowledge of the sources, there is a lack of understanding of why these sources have increased predilection, nor is there an understanding of the differences in mechanisms behind each metastasis process.

== Diagnosis ==
CNS metastases can be diagnosed through various imaging approaches and clinical manifestations. These techniques allow doctors to detect abnormalities and identify the location and extent of the metastatic spread.

=== Imaging technology: MRI and CT scans ===
CNS metastases are diagnosed through imaging techniques that produce detailed images of the inside of the body, including the bones, organs, muscles, and nerves. Magnetic resonance imaging (MRI) and computed tomography (CT) are two representative imaging procedures for this purpose.

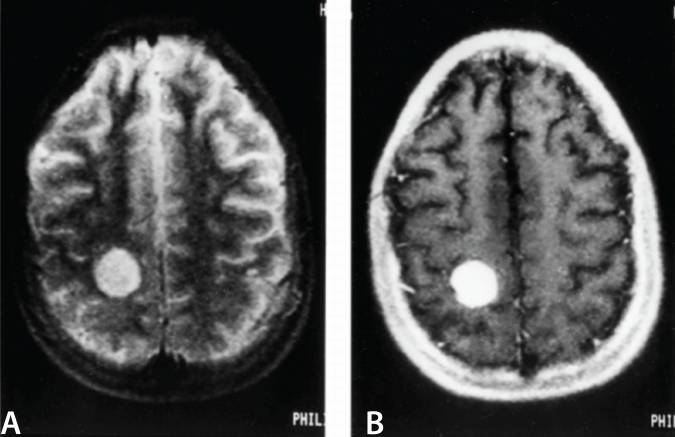
Brain MRI of a patient diagnosed with primary cardiac angiosarcoma that metastasised to the brain.

MRI scans use strong magnetic fields and radio waves to create an image, while CT scans use X-rays. MRI scans produce more detailed images of bodily structures, particularly soft tissues, including the brain, and are better at detecting CNS metastases than CT scans. However, CT scans are sometimes used as the initial imaging modality because of their lower cost and efficiency in screening for multiple conditions.

=== Alternative techniques ===
When a lesion is suspected of having CNS metastases and its primary site is unknown, additional imaging and biopsies may be necessary for an accurate diagnosis. These procedures allow medical practitioners to examine and evaluate the histology, or micro-anatomy, of the suspected tissue.

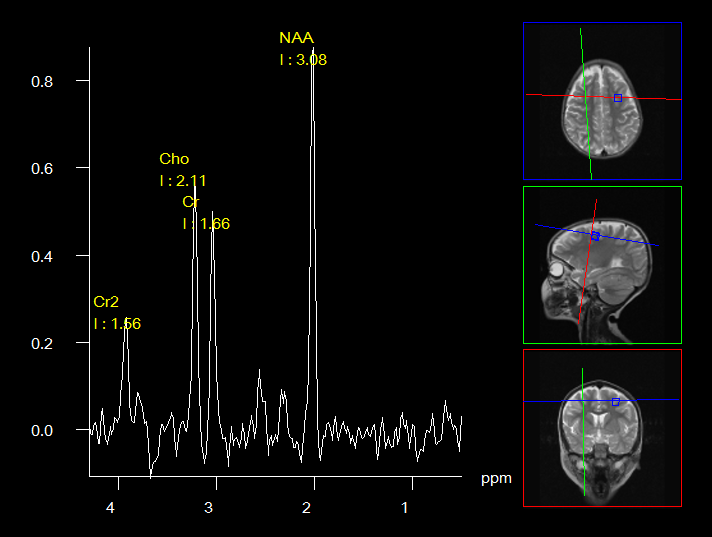
MR spectroscopy (MRS) of the brain to identify different chemical components based on their unique resonant frequencies.

Biopsies involve the surgical removal of the suspected tissue, but can be invasive. They warrant a thorough evaluation of their necessity and the patient's ability to withstand the side effects.

A less intrusive alternative imaging technique is magnetic resonance spectroscopy (MRS), which is used to determine the chemical composition of cells. However, it is not as reliable as biopsies.

These techniques are also relevant if a singular metastasis site is inadequate to explain the patient's symptoms. In this case, additional screenings would be warranted to locate the other lesions and the tumour source. With this information, doctors aim to determine the metastasis lineage and accurately identify the underlying cancer. Modern clinical screening allows the detection of numerous serum levels of circulating tumour cells. However, a disproportionate amount of metastasis is still undetectable, causing under-diagnosis.

== Therapeutic methods ==
The best treatment approach for patients depends on a comprehensive assessment of several factors, including the primary cancer type, tumour location, prognosis, and patient preference, among others. Some of the main treatment methods are surgery, radiotherapy, chemotherapy, immunotherapy, and other system-targeting therapies.

=== Surgery and Radiotherapy ===
The typical treatment pathway is receiving surgical resection to remove the CNS metastases, then undergoing postoperative radiotherapy. Radiation therapy can be delivered through stereotactic radiosurgery (SRS), whole-brain radiotherapy (WBRT), or a combination of the two. In SRS, a high dose of radiation is delivered to the tumour site while sparing the surrounding healthy tissues. This is particularly useful for small CNS metastases. WBRT, as the name suggests, is delivered to the entire brain and is preferred in cases with a risk of developing metastases or having multiple metastases.

=== Medication ===
Other methods of management are mostly in the form of drugs. These medications can be employed to target specific systems in patients or in cancer cells themselves. The wide variety of available drugs has varying impacts and side effects on a per-patient basis. One of the most popular examples of drug-based management is immunotherapy, which bolsters the patient's immune system to fight cancer. Since this process is less intrusive and more varied than traditional chemotherapy or surgery, it is preferred for patients with lower tolerability, such as the elderly.

If cancer recurs or progresses, the therapeutic methods are adjusted, and varying combinations of all available options are explored. Coping with successive disease progression can be challenging due to the taxing side effects, which can take a physical and mental toll on patients. Consequently, the prognosis for further attempts may not be as promising as it was initially.

== Recent development ==
Diagnostic techniques for CNS metastasis are a major area of ongoing research, as detecting metastatic lesions early is crucial for timely treatment and better patient outcomes.

One promising field is the use of biomarkers- proteins, genes, or other molecules associated with a specific condition. These are used to indicate normal or abnormal conditions of the body. Early research suggests screening for biomarkers could facilitate easier diagnosis and have predictive applications. Biomarkers need to be uniquely representative of CNS metastasis. Otherwise, there could be high incidences of false-positive results, rendering the method less precise.

Another rising approach is chimeric antigen receptor (CAR) T cells. This is a type of immunotherapy that involves engineering a patient's T cells, a type of white blood cell, to identify and attack cancerous cells.

Both methods require a better understanding of the molecular determinants of CNS metastasis. Knowing these biomolecular factors could also lead to the development of preventative methods, a heavily underdeveloped area in CNS metastasis.
