= Congenital erosive and vesicular dermatosis =

- Specialty: Dermatology

Congenital erosive and vesicular dermatosis is a cutaneous condition characterized by generalized erosions, vesicles, crusting and 'scalded skin-like' erythematous areas affecting up to 75% of the body surface area.

== Signs and symptoms ==
Congenital erosive and vesicular dermatosis exhibits erythema, vesicles, erosions, crusts, and fissures affecting more than 75% of the skin at birth. Within ten days to three months, the lesions heal on their own, leaving behind a pathognomonic reticulate scar.

Clinical characteristics linked to congenital erosive and vesicular dermatosis include cicatricial baldness (39%), nail dysplasia or hypoplasia (39%), hyperthermia with/or hypohidrosis in scarred areas (39%), ophthalmological abnormalities (36%), and neurodevelopmental abnormalities (30%).

== Causes ==
There is no established pathophysiology for congenital erosive and vesicular dermatosis, and the illness seems to be sporadic. Intrauterine infections, amniotic adhesions, and a developmental abnormality with atypical repair in preterm skin are among the etiologic possibilities.

== Diagnosis ==
The congenital erosive and vesicular dermatosis histopathologic results vary according to the disease's stage. Epidermal necrosis, subepidermal vesiculation, and an eroded epidermis with a primarily neutrophilic or mixed (containing eosinophils, histiocytes, lymphocytes, and neutrophils) dermal infiltration have all been reported in early inflammatory lesions. Biopsy specimens from late lesions might either look normal in the dermis or exhibit scar development with a decrease in hair follicles and absent eccrine glands, according to histopathologic evaluation.

== See also ==
- Melanotic neuroectodermal tumor of infancy
- List of cutaneous conditions
