= Oligodendroglioma =

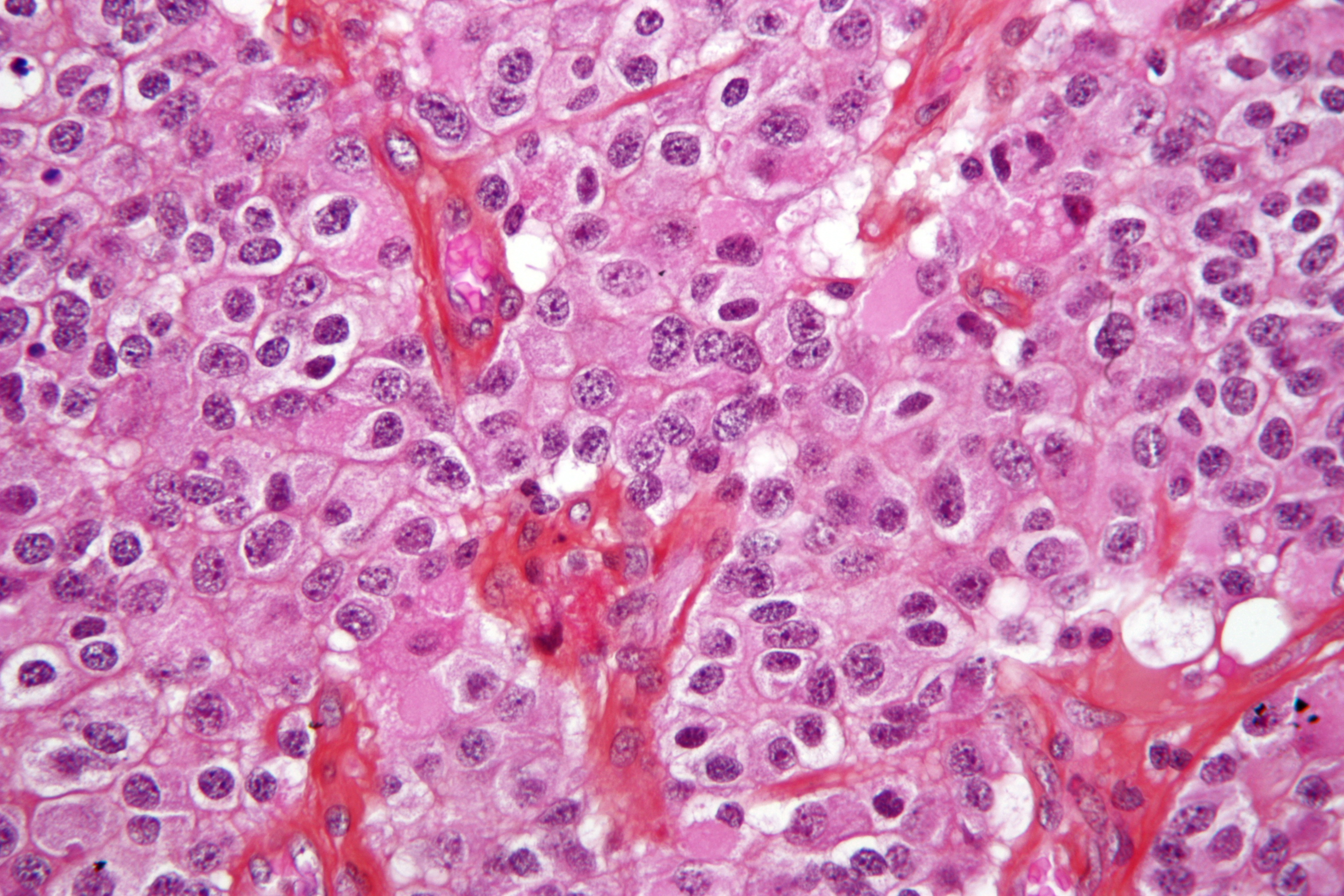
- Micrograph of an oligodendroglioma showing the characteristic branching, small, chicken wire-like blood vessels and fried egg-like cells, with clear cytoplasm and well-defined cell borders. H&E stain.
- Specialty: Neuro-oncology, neurosurgery
- Usual onset: Between ages 35 and 44
- Prognosis: Five-year survival rate: 74.1%
- Frequency: ~1,217 new diagnoses per year (United States)

Oligodendrogliomas are a type of glioma that are believed to originate from the oligodendrocytes of the brain or from a glial precursor cell. They occur primarily in adults (9.4% of all primary brain and central nervous system tumors) but are also found in children (4% of all primary brain tumors). With a 0.2 incidence rate out of 100,000 adults, oligodendrogliomas comprise approximately 5% of all central nervous system tumors.

== Signs and symptoms ==
Oligodendroglioma arise mainly in the frontal lobe and in 50–80% of cases, the first symptom is the onset of seizure activity without any prior symptoms . Headaches associated with increased intracranial pressure are also common in individuals with oligodendroglioma. Depending on the location of the tumor, many different neurological and neuropsychological deficits can be induced, including, but not limited to, visual loss, motor weakness, cognitive decline, and anxiety. A computed tomography (CT) or magnetic resonance imaging (MRI) scan is necessary to characterize tumor size, location, and hetero- or homogeneity. Final diagnosis relies on biopsy and histopathologic examination of the tumor mass.

== Cause ==
The cause of oligodendrogliomas is unknown. Some studies have linked oligodendroglioma with a viral cause. A 2009 Oxford Neurosymposium study illustrated a 69% correlation between NJDS gene mutation and the tumor initiation. A single case report has linked oligodendroglioma to irradiation of pituitary adenoma.

== Diagnosis ==
=== Microscopic appearance ===
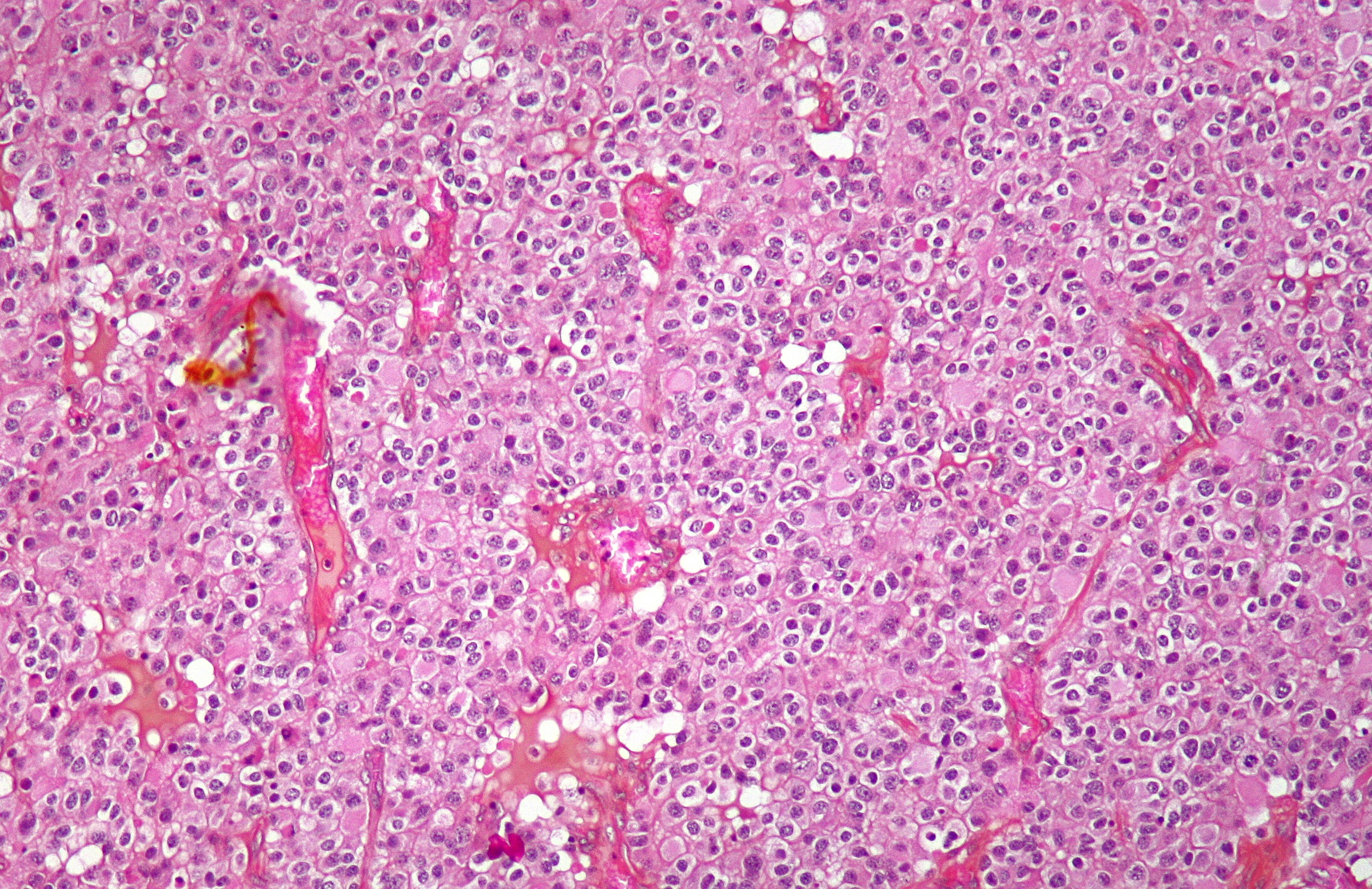
Low magnification micrograph of an oligodendroglioma showing the characteristic, small, branching, chicken wire–like blood vessels. H&E stain.

Oligodendrogliomas cannot currently be differentiated from other brain lesions solely by their clinical or radiographic appearance. As such, a brain biopsy is the only method of definitive diagnosis. Oligodendrogliomas recapitulate the appearance of the normal resident oligodendroglia of the brain. (Their name derives from the Greek roots 'oligo' meaning "few" and 'dendro' meaning "trees".) They are generally composed of cells with small to slightly enlarged round nuclei with dark, compact nuclei and a small amount of eosinophilic cytoplasm. They are often referred to as "fried egg" cells due to their histologic appearance (though, the perinuclear halo on permanent sections is an artifact of tissue drying; fresh tissue lacks this characteristic "fried egg" appearance). They appear as a monotonous population of mildly enlarged round cells infiltrating normal brain parenchyma and producing vague nodules. Although the tumor may appear to be vaguely circumscribed, it is by definition a diffusely infiltrating tumor.

Classically they tend to have a vasculature of finely branching capillaries that may take on a "chicken wire" appearance. When invading grey matter structures such as cortex, the neoplastic oligodendrocytes tend to cluster around neurons exhibiting a phenomenon referred to as "perineuronal satellitosis". Oligodendrogliomas may invade preferentially around vessels or under the pial surface of the brain.

Oligodendrogliomas must be differentiated from the more common astrocytoma. Non-classical variants and combined tumors of both oligodendroglioma and astrocytoma differentiation are seen, making this distinction controversial between different neuropathology groups. Molecular diagnostics may make this differentiation obsolete in the future. Although, in normal brain tissue, OLIG2 expresses on oligodendrocytes but not on mature astrocytes, it expresses similarly on both adult astrocytoma (including both IDH-mutant diffuse astrocytoma and anaplastic astrocytoma, as well as IDH-wildtype glioblastoma) and oligodendroglioma. Therefore, OLIG2 should not be used to differentiate these classes of adult gliomas, although the expression level might predict the IDH mutation status in some clinical circumstances.

Other glial and glioneuronal tumors with which they are often confused due to their monotonous round cell appearance include pilocytic astrocytoma, central neurocytoma, the so-called dysembryoplastic neuroepithelial tumor, or occasionally ependymoma.

=== Histopathological grading ===
The histopathologic grading of oligodendrogliomas is controversial. Currently, the most commonly used grading schema is based on the year 2007 World Health Organization (WHO) guidelines. An updated classification is in progress. Oligodendrogliomas are generally dichotomized into grade II (low grade) tumor.

Unfortunately, the WHO guidelines include subjective criteria in grade II. In addition, the presence of low mitotic activity, vascular proliferation and necrosis, including pseudo-pallisading necrosis, is insufficient by itself to elevate the grade of this tumor. This leads to inevitable interobserver variability in diagnosis by pathologists. The ultimate responsibility for making treatment decisions and interpretation of this diagnosis lies with the oncologist in consultation with the patient and their family.

It has been proposed that WHO guidelines should contain a category for grade IV oligodendrogliomas which essentially appear to be glial neoplasms with overwhelming features of glioblastoma multiforme (GBM) arising from known lower grade oligodendrogliomas or GBM with a significant proportion of oligodendroglial differentiation. The diagnostic utility of this latter category is uncertain as these tumors may behave either like glioblastoma or grade III Anaplastic oligodendrogliomas. As such, this is an exceptionally unusual diagnosis.

The updated WHO guidelines published in 2007 recommends classifying such tumors for the time being as 'glioblastoma with oligodendroglioma component'. It remains to be established whether or not these tumors carry a better prognosis than standard glioblastomas.

=== Molecular genetics ===
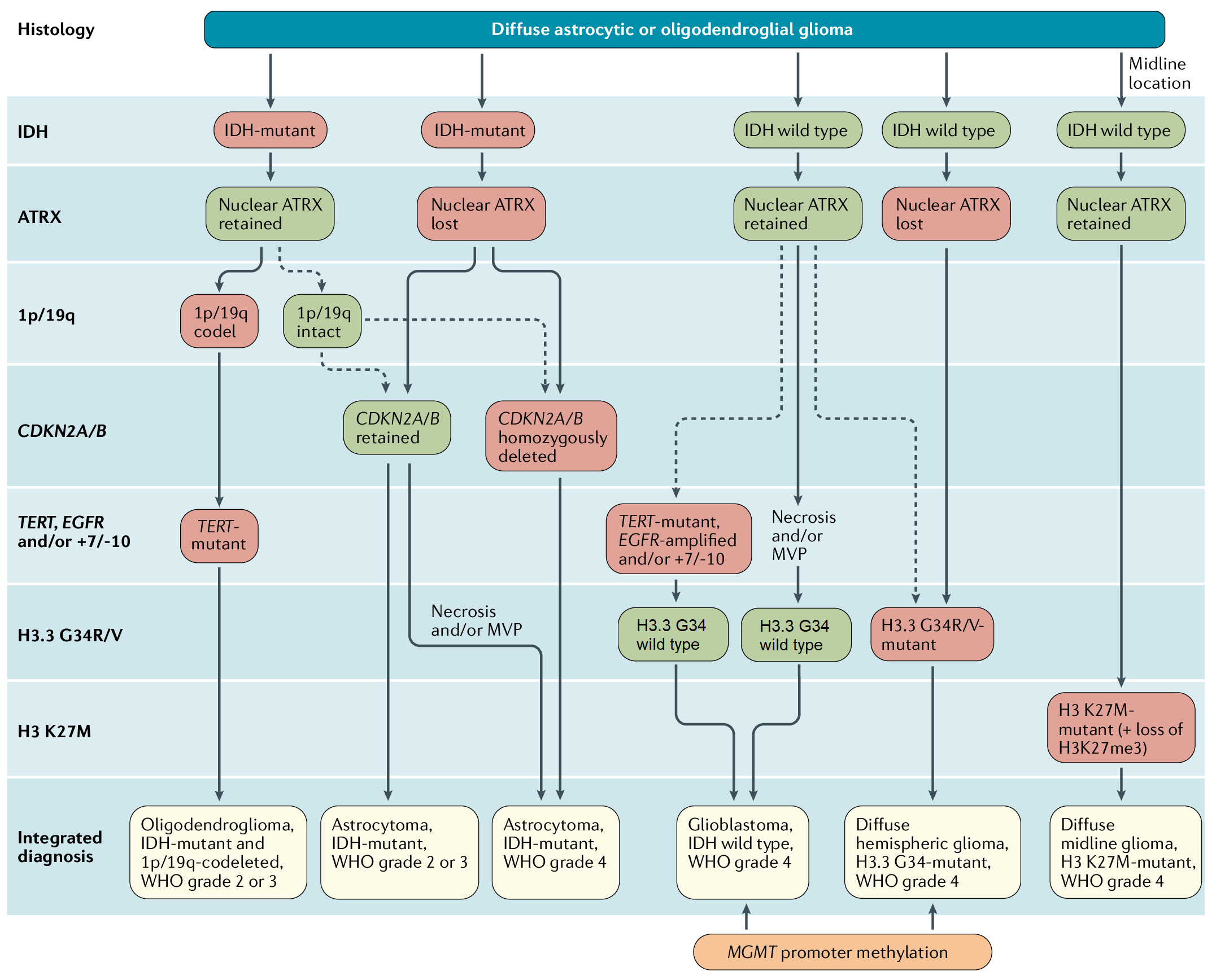
Diagnosis of diffuse glioma, with typical characteristics of oligodendroglioma at left

In the WHO 2021 CNS5 Classification, oligodendroglioma is named "Oligodendroglioma, IDH-mutant, and 1p/19q-codeleted", and requires the presence of IDH1 or IDH2 mutations and the codeletion of chromosome 1p and 19q arms. Interestingly, oligodendroglioma has a higher rate of IDH2 mutation than astrocytoma, so the IHC antibody against the common IDH1 p.R132H mutant might not pick up the mutation.

By far, the most common structural deformity found is co-deletion of chromosomal arms 1p and 19q. The high frequency of co-deletion is a striking feature of this glial tumour and is considered as a "genetic signature" of oligodendroglioma. Allelic losses on 1p and 19q, either separately or combined, are more common in classic oligodendrogliomas than in either astrocytomas or oligoastrocytomas. In one study, classic oligodendrogliomas showed 1p loss in 35 of 42 (83%) cases, 19q loss in 28 of 39 (72%), and these were combined in 27 of 39 (69%) cases; there was no significant difference in 1p/19q loss of heterozygosity status between low-grade and anaplastic oligodendroglioma. 1p/19q co-deletion has been correlated with both chemosensitivity and improved prognosis in oligodendrogliomas. The gene products lost as a consequence of this codeletion may include mediators of resistance to genotoxic therapies. Alternatively, 1p/19q loss might be an early oncogenic lesion promoting the formation of glial neoplasms, which retain high sensitivity to genotoxic stress. Most larger cancer treatment centers routinely check for the deletion of 1p/19q as part of the pathology report for oligodendrogliomas. The status of the 1p/19q loci can be detected by fluorescence in situ hybridization (FISH), loss of heterozygosity (LOH) analysis or virtual karyotyping. Virtual karyotyping has the advantage of assessing the entire genome in one assay, as well as the 1p/19q loci. This allows assessment of other key loci in glial tumors, such as EGFR (EGFR) and TP53 copy number status.

Whereas the prognostic relevance of 1p and 19q deletions is well established for mixed oligoastrocytomas, the prognostic relevance of the deletions for low-grade gliomas is more controversial. In terms of low-grade gliomas, a recent study also suggests that 1p/19q co-deletion may be associated with a (1;19)(q10;p10) translocation which, like the combined 1p/19q deletion, is associated with superior overall survival and progression-free survival in low-grade glioma patients. Oligodendrogliomas show only rarely mutations in the p53 gene, which is in contrast to other gliomas. EGFR amplification and whole 1p/19q codeletion are mutually exclusive and predictive of completely different outcomes, with EGFR amplification predicting poor prognosis. There is a strong correlation between 1p/19q codeletion and the expression of proneural genes, suggesting that gliomas with a 1p19q codeletion represent a subgroup of proneural gliomas.

== Treatment ==
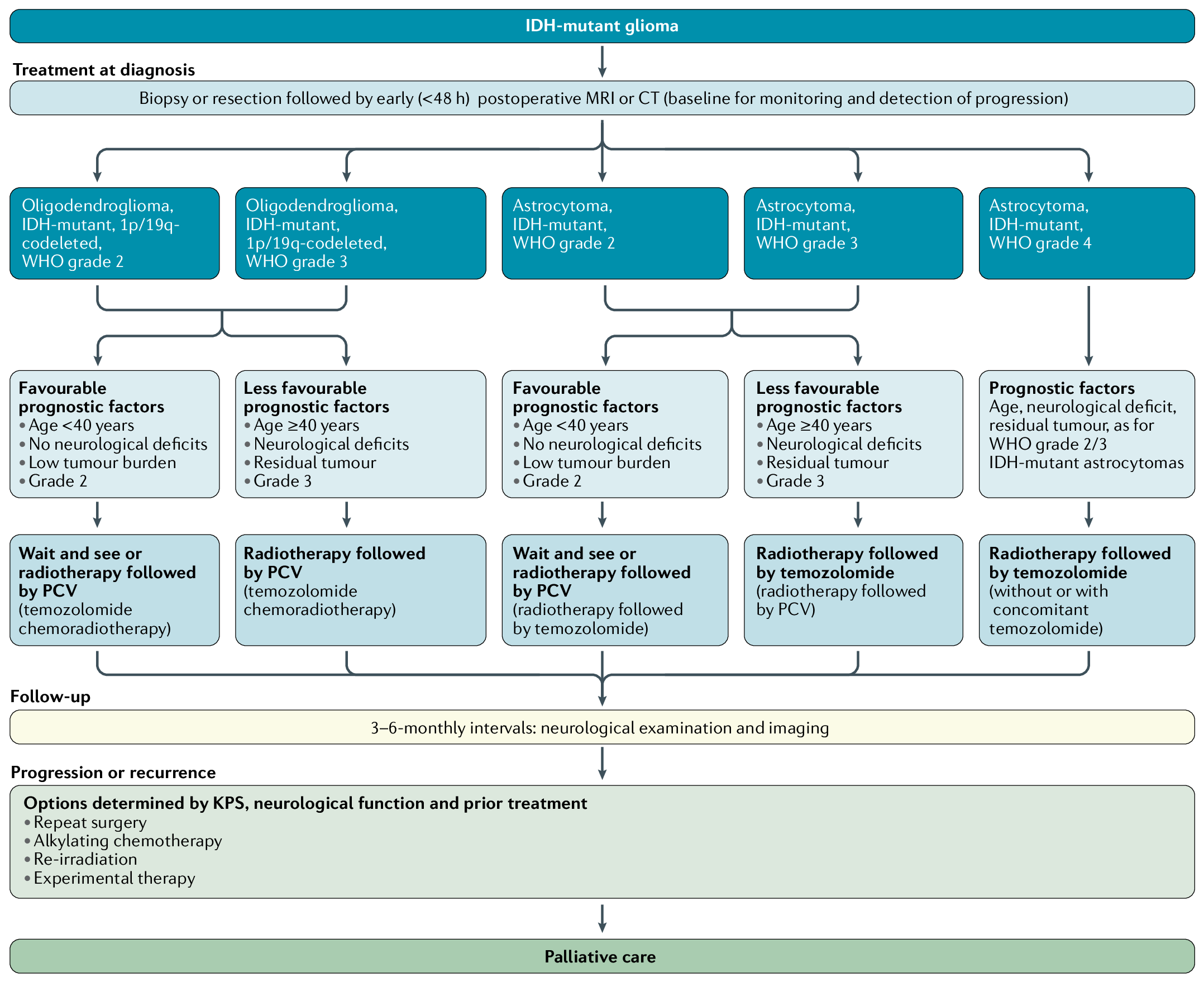
Management of IDH-mutant gliomas, with oligodendroglioma at left

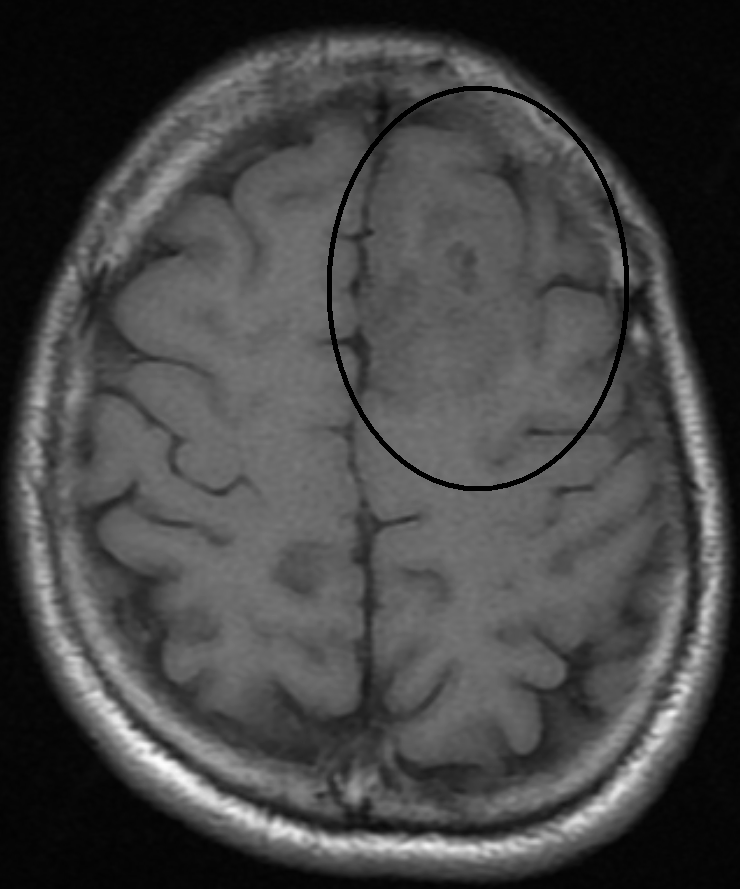
An oligodendroglioma as seen on MRI

Oligodendrogliomas are generally considered to be incurable using current treatments. However compared to the more common astrocytomas, they are slowly growing with prolonged survival. In a 2019 study, an 80% survival rate was reported at 15 years for 1p/19q co-deleted oligodendroglioma treated with upfront chemotherapy irrespective of tumor grade.

Reported survival figures can be misleading since they do not always factor in the types of treatment nor the genetic signature of the tumors. A 2005 study analyzed survival based on chromosomal deletions and the effects of radiation or chemotherapy as treatment, with the following results (both low-grade and anaplastic oligodendrogliomas): 1p/19q deletion with radiation = 121 months (mean), 1p/19q deletion with chemotherapy = over 160 months (mean not yet reached), no 1p/19q deletion with radiation = 58 months (mean), and no 1p/19q deletion with chemotherapy = 75 months (mean).

Given the indolent nature of this tumor and the potential morbidity associated with neurosurgery, chemotherapy and radiation therapy, most neurooncologists will initially pursue a course of watchful waiting and treat patients symptomatically. Symptomatic treatment often includes the use of anticonvulsants for seizures and steroids for brain swelling.

The standard dosing schedule of temozolomide is five consecutive days of daily dosing during 28-day cycles. However, different dosing schedules may produce better results, such as continuous daily dosing using lower amounts of drug (e.g. 21-day dosing during 28-day cycles). As an example of an altered dosing schedule, promising results have been shown using lower daily doses on each day for 7 weeks, followed by a 4-week off periods. Regarding the duration of dosing, for oligodendrogliomas the duration prescribed by oncologists varies considerably ranging from 6 cycles to over 32 cycles (i.e. over three years). In one study, researchers compared patients who received temozolomide for at least 12 months on the 5/28 day cycle, dividing such patients into two groups: "short term" patients receiving temozolomide for 12–18 cycles and those "long term" patients receiving 19 or more cycles (range was 19 to 32 cycles). Researchers found that there was a statistically significant advantage for "long term" treatment (median progression free survival for "short term" patients was 95 weeks (follow-up of 73 weeks), but for "long term" patients the median progression free survival was not yet reached (follow-up of 134 weeks)).

Due to the diffusely infiltrating nature, oligodendrogliomas cannot be completely resected and are not curable by surgical excision. If the tumor mass compresses adjacent brain structures, neurosurgeons typically remove as much of the tumor as possible without damaging other critical, healthy brain structures. Surgery may be followed up by chemotherapy, radiation, or a mix of both, however recent studies suggest that radiation does not improve overall survival (even when age, clinical data, histological grading, and type of surgery are considered).

== Prognosis ==
Oligodendrogliomas, like all other infiltrating gliomas, have a very high (almost uniform) rate of recurrence and gradually increase in grade over time. Recurrent tumors are generally treated with more aggressive chemotherapy and radiation therapy. Recently, stereotactic surgery has proven successful in treating small tumors that have been diagnosed early.

Long-term survival is reported in a minority of patients. With aggressive treatment and close monitoring, it is possible to outlive the typical life expectancies for low grade oligodendroglioma. Westergaard's study (1997) showed that patients younger than 20 years had a median survival of 17.5 years. For patients that are over 30, the survival rate is lower but as treatment options grow, the survival rate is higher. However, a patient with bad general health is more likely to die sooner than those that have good general health. Another study shows a 34% survival rate after 20 years. However, as discussed above, such figures can be misleading since they do not factor in the types of treatment nor the genetic signature of the tumors. Additionally, such historic data loses significance due to the relatively long survival of patients (compared to other types of brain tumors) and the introduction of newer treatment options over time. In a 2019 study, an 80% survival rate was reported at 15 years for 1p/19q co-deleted oligodendroglioma treated with upfront chemotherapy irrespective of tumor grade.
