= Glioma =

Tumor of the glial cells of the brain or spine

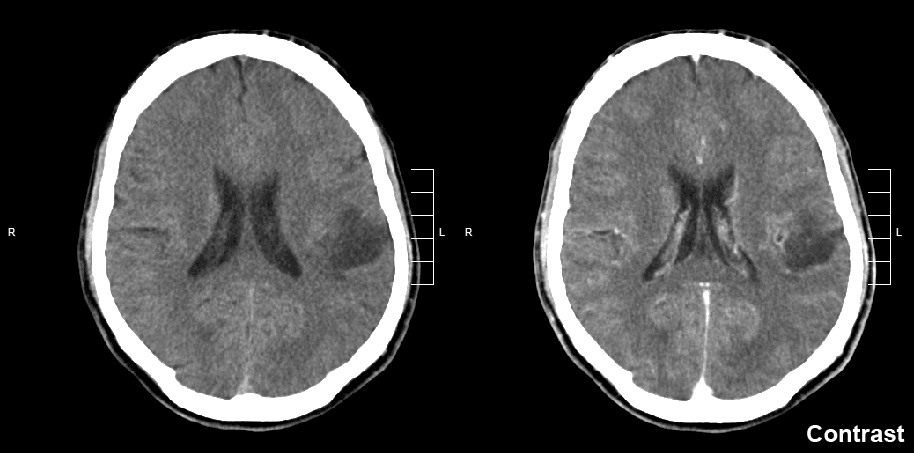
- Glioma in the left parietal lobe (brain CT scan), WHO grade 2
- Specialty: Oncology, Neurology
- Risk factors: Advanced age, ionizing radiation
- Diagnostic method: Brain imaging
- Frequency: 0.0343%

A glioma is a type of malignant tumor originating in the glial cells of the brain or spinal cord. Gliomas comprise about 30% of all brain and central nervous system tumors and 80% of all malignant brain tumors. Common subtypes include astrocytoma (cancer of astrocytes), glioblastoma (an aggressive form of astrocytoma), oligodendroglioma (cancer of oligodendrocytes), and ependymoma (cancer of ependymal cells).

== Signs and symptoms ==
The presentation of a glioma depends on the part of the central nervous system (CNS) that the glioma affects.

A brain glioma can cause headaches, vomiting, memory loss, seizures, vision problems, speech difficulties, and cranial nerve disorders. These symptoms arise as a result of increased intracranial pressure. When the glioma is located in or around the optic nerve, cognitive impairments such as vision loss can happen.

Spinal cord gliomas can cause pain, weakness, or numbness in the extremities of the body (arms, legs, hands, feet).

Gliomas do not usually metastasize through the bloodstream, but they can spread via the cerebrospinal fluid and cause "drop metastases" to the spinal cord. Complex visual hallucinations have been described as a symptom of low-grade glioma. Children with sub-acute CNS disorders that produce cranial nerve abnormalities (especially of cranial nerve VII and the lower bulbar nerves), long-tract signs, unsteady gait secondary to spasticity, and behavioral changes are likely to have a pontine glioma, a tumor of the brainstem.

== Causes ==
=== Hereditary disorders ===
The exact causes of gliomas are not known. Hereditary disorders such as neurofibromatosis and tuberous sclerosis complex are known to predispose individuals to developing gliomas. Different oncogenes can cooperate in the development of gliomas.

=== Radiation ===
The best-known risk factor is exposure to ionizing radiation, including the radiation emitted by CT scans. The dose-response for the relationship between low-dose ionizing radiation and glioma risk is a risk increase of 55% per 100 milligray of radiation. A link between gliomas and electromagnetic radiation from cell phones has not been conclusively proven. It was considered possible, though several large studies have found no conclusive evidence, as summarized by the National Institute of Health's National Cancer Institute review of the topic and its numerous citations, and the FCC. However, further research is still being pursued to obtain more robust evidence and verify that there is no relationship (the NIH's National Institute of Environmental Health Sciences most recent press release discussed an ongoing study showing mildly positive results, although it appears there may have been issues with the control group dying prematurely).

=== Infection with cytomegalovirus ===
Some studies have reported that glioblastomas are infected with cytomegalovirus, with suggestions that this may speed the development of tumors. However, this is a controversial opinion, with recent in-depth studies failing to find an association between viral infection and glioma growth. There is also evidence that previous studies may have been impacted by false-positive antibody staining artifacts.

=== Farming ===
Studies have shown that farmers have higher rates of gliomas compared to the general population. In a 2021 meta-analysis, 40 of 52 studies since 1998 reported positive associations between farming and brain cancer, with effect estimates ranging from 1.03 to 6.53, of which 80% are gliomas. Livestock farming was associated with a greater risk compared to crop farming. Farmers with documented exposure to pesticides had a more than 20% elevated risk of brain cancer. The TRACTOR project study, including 1,017 brain tumors among 1,036,069 farm managers, published in 2022, showed an increased risk of glioma in pig farming (HR = 2.28), crop farming (HR = 1.28) and fruit arboriculture (HR = 1.72).

=== Other causes ===
Data show that architects, surveyors, retail workers, butchers, and engineers have higher rates of gliomas.

=== Inherited polymorphisms of the DNA repair genes ===
Germ-line (inherited) polymorphisms of the DNA repair genes ERCC1, ERCC2 (XPD) and XRCC1 increase the risk of glioma. This indicates that altered or deficient repair of DNA damage contributes to the formation of gliomas. DNA damage is a likely primary cause of progression to cancer in general. Excess DNA damages can give rise to mutations through translesion synthesis. Furthermore, incomplete DNA repair can give rise to epigenetic alterations or epimutations. Such mutations and epimutations may provide a cell with a proliferative advantage which can then, by a process of natural selection, lead to progression to cancer.

Epigenetic repression of DNA repair genes is often found in progression to sporadic glioblastoma. For instance, methylation of the DNA repair gene MGMT promoter was observed in 51% to 66% of glioblastoma specimens. In addition, in some glioblastomas, the MGMT protein is deficient due to another type of epigenetic alteration. MGMT protein expression may also be reduced due to increased levels of a microRNA that inhibits the ability of the MGMT messenger RNA to produce the MGMT protein. Zhang et al. found, in the glioblastomas without methylated MGMT promoters, that the level of microRNA miR-181d is inversely correlated with protein expression of MGMT and that the direct target of miR-181d is the MGMT mRNA 3'UTR (the three prime untranslated region of MGMT messenger RNA).

Epigenetic reductions in expression of another DNA repair protein, ERCC1, were found in an assortment of 32 gliomas. For 17 of the 32 (53%) of the gliomas tested, ERCC1 protein expression was reduced or absent. In the case of 12 gliomas (37.5%) this reduction was due to methylation of the ERCC1 promoter. For the other 5 gliomas with reduced ERCC1 protein expression, the reduction could have been due to epigenetic alterations in microRNAs that affect ERCC1 expression.

When expression of DNA repair genes is reduced, DNA damages accumulate in cells at a higher than normal level, and such excess damages cause increased frequencies of mutation. Mutations in gliomas frequently occur in either isocitrate dehydrogenase (IDH) 1 or 2 genes. One of these mutations (mostly in IDH1) occurs in about 80% of low-grade gliomas and secondary high-grade gliomas. Wang et al. pointed out that IDH1 and IDH2 mutant cells produce an excess metabolic intermediate, 2-hydroxyglutarate, which binds to catalytic sites in key enzymes that are important in altering histone and DNA promoter methylation. Thus, mutations in IDH1 and IDH2 generate a "DNA CpG island methylator phenotype or CIMP" that causes promoter hypermethylation and concomitant silencing of tumor suppressor genes such as DNA repair genes MGMT and ERCC1. On the other hand, Cohen et al. and Molenaar et al. pointed out that mutations in IDH1 or IDH2 can cause increased oxidative stress. Increased oxidative damage to DNA could be mutagenic. This is supported by an increased number of DNA double-strand breaks in IDH1-mutated glioma cells. Thus, IDH1 or IDH2 mutations act as driver mutations in glioma carcinogenesis, though it is not clear by which role they are primarily acting. A study, involving 51 patients with brain gliomas who had two or more biopsies over time, showed that mutation in the IDH1 gene occurred prior to the occurrence of a p53 mutation or a 1p/19q loss of heterozygosity, indicating that an IDH1 mutation is an early driver mutation.

== Pathophysiology ==
High-grade gliomas are highly vascular tumors and have a tendency to infiltrate diffusely. They have extensive areas of necrosis and hypoxia. Often, tumor growth causes a breakdown of the blood–brain barrier in the vicinity of the tumor. As a rule, high-grade gliomas almost always grow back even after complete surgical excision, so they are commonly called recurrent cancer of the brain.

Conversely, low-grade gliomas often grow slowly, and the management of these cases typically involves early-removal or debulking of the tumor followed by monitoring; although it is often possible to safely manage low-grade gliomas with 'watch-and-wait' surveillance alone, particularly in younger patients, most literature supports early removal, with or without chemotherapy and/or radiotherapy, to reduce the risk of progression to a higher-grade glioma.

Several acquired (not inherited) genetic mutations have been found in gliomas. Tumor suppressor protein 53 (p53) is mutated early in the disease. p53 is the "guardian of the genome", which, during DNA and cell duplication, makes sure the DNA is copied correctly and destroys the cell (apoptosis) if the DNA is mutated and cannot be fixed. When p53 itself is mutated, other mutations can survive. Phosphatase and tensin homolog (PTEN), another tumor suppressor gene, is itself lost or mutated. Epidermal growth factor receptor, a growth factor that normally stimulates cells to divide, is amplified and stimulates cells to divide excessively. Together, these mutations lead to cells dividing uncontrollably, a hallmark of cancer. In 2009, mutations in IDH1 and IDH2 were found to be part of the mechanism and associated with a less favorable prognosis.

== Diagnosis ==
=== Classification ===
==== By type of cell ====
Gliomas are named according to the specific type of cell with which they share histological features, but not necessarily from which they originate. The main types of glioma are:

- Ependymomas: ependymal cells
- Astrocytomas: astrocytes (glioblastoma multiforme is a malignant astrocytoma and the most common primary brain tumor among adults).
- Oligodendrogliomas: oligodendrocytes
- Brainstem glioma: develop in the brain stem
- Optic nerve glioma: develop in or around the optic nerve
- Chordoid glioma, a rare low-grade tumor of the third ventricle
- Mixed gliomas, such as oligoastrocytomas, contain cells from different types of glia

==== By grade ====
Gliomas are further categorised according to their grade, which is determined by pathologic evaluation of the tumor. The neuropathological evaluation and diagnostics of brain tumor specimens is performed according to WHO Classification of tumors of the Central Nervous System.

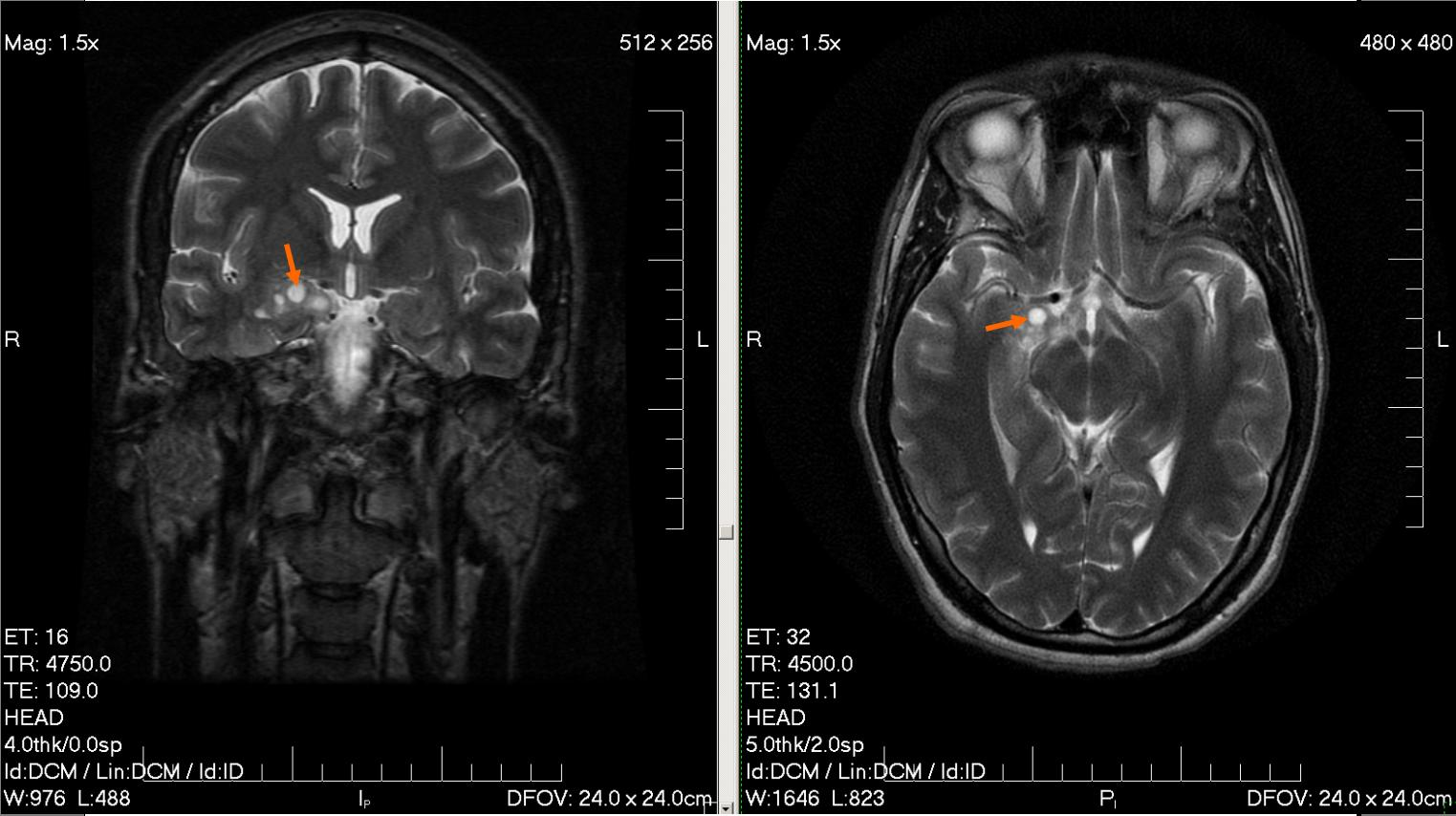
Low-grade brain glioma in a 28-year-old male (taken on 10 July 2007)

- Biologically benign gliomas [WHO grade I] are comparatively low risk and can be removed surgically depending on their location
- Low-grade gliomas [WHO grade II] are well-differentiated (not anaplastic); these tend to exhibit benign tendencies and portend a better prognosis for the patient. However, they have a uniform rate of recurrence and increase in grade over time so should be classified as malignant.
- High-grade [WHO grades III–IV] gliomas are undifferentiated or anaplastic; these are malignant and carry a worse prognosis. Despite being classified as a high-grade glioma, infant-type hemispheric gliomas have relatively good clinical outcomes, yet they endure significant deficits, making them good candidates for therapy de-escalation and trials of molecular targeted therapy.

Of numerous grading systems in use, the most common is the World Health Organization (WHO) grading system for astrocytoma, under which tumors are graded from I (least advanced disease—best prognosis) to IV (most advanced disease—worst prognosis).

==== By location ====
Gliomas can be classified according to whether they are above or below a membrane in the brain called the tentorium. The tentorium separates the cerebrum (above) from the cerebellum (below).

- The supratentorial is above the tentorium, in the cerebrum, and mostly found in adults (70%).
- The infratentorial is below the tentorium, in the cerebellum, and mostly found in children (70%).
- The pontine tumors are located in the pons of the brainstem. The brainstem has three parts (pons, midbrain, and medulla); the pons controls critical functions such as breathing, making surgery on these extremely dangerous.

=== Integrated diagnosis ===
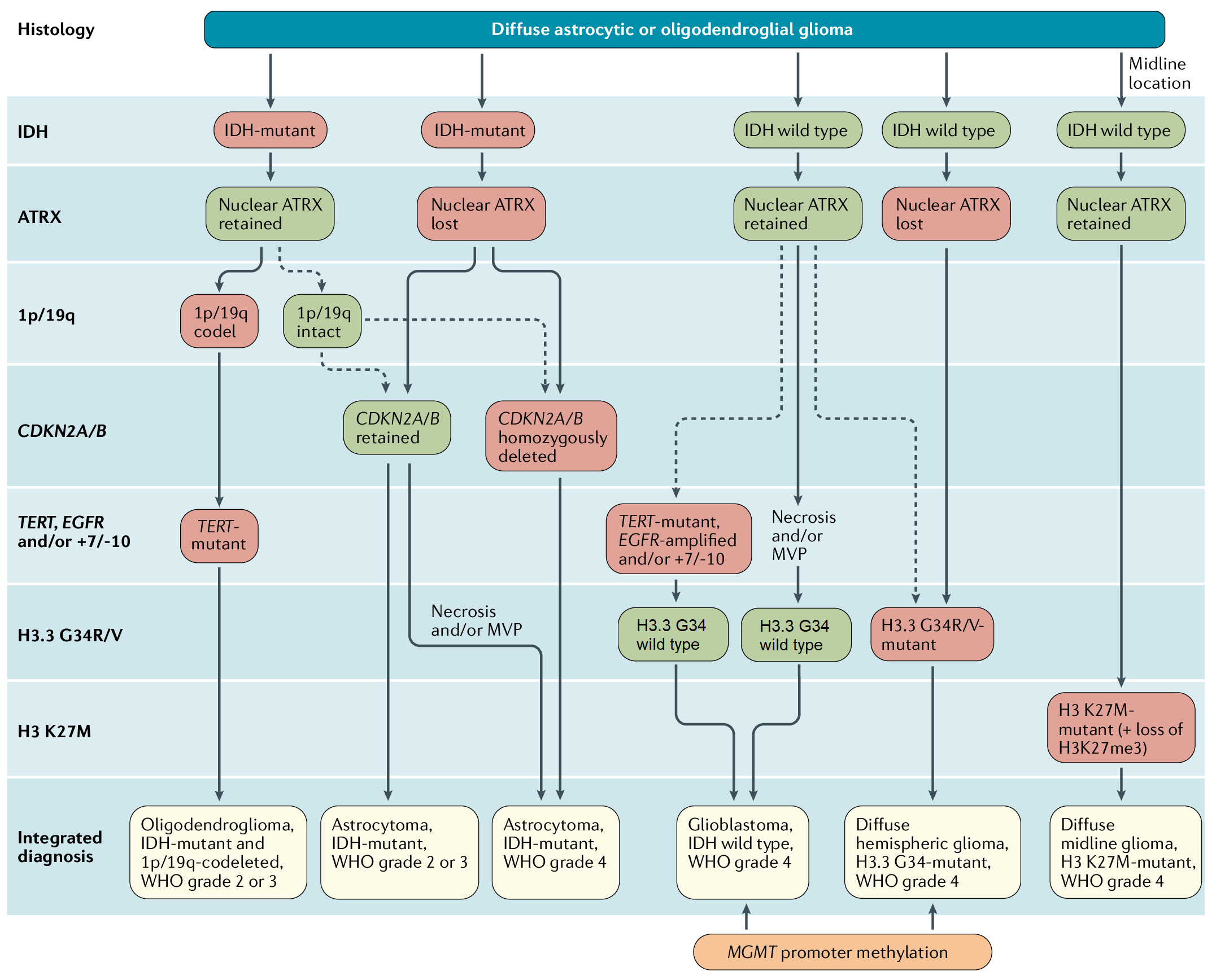
Diagnosis of diffuse glioma. MVP = microvascular proliferation. The presence and absence of the diagnostically most relevant molecular alterations for each tumor type are highlighted with red and green boxes.

The modern approach to the diagnosis of diffuse gliomas takes mainly the histopathology and molecular profile into account. Tissue specimens obtained through biopsy sampling in patients with diffuse gliomas are routinely assessed by immunohistochemistry for the presence of R132H-mutant IDH1 and loss of nuclear ATRX. In patients aged >55 years with a histologically typical glioblastoma, without a pre-existing lower grade glioma, with a non-midline tumor location and with retained nuclear ATRX expression, immunohistochemical negativity for IDH1 R132H suffices for the classification as IDH-wild-type glioblastoma. In all other instances of diffuse gliomas, a lack of IDH1 R132H immunopositivity should be followed by IDH1 and IDH2 DNA sequencing to detect or exclude the presence of non-canonical mutations. IDH-wild-type diffuse astrocytic gliomas without microvascular proliferation or necrosis should be tested for EGFR amplification, TERT promoter mutation and a +7/–10 cytogenetic signature as molecular characteristics of IDH-wild-type glioblastomas. In addition, the presence of histone H3.3 G34R/V mutations should be assessed by immunohistochemistry or DNA sequencing to identify H3.3 G34-mutant diffuse hemispheric gliomas, in particular in young patients with IDH-wild-type gliomas (such as those <50 years of age with nuclear ATRX loss in tumor cells). Diffuse gliomas of the thalamus, brainstem or spinal cord should be evaluated for histone H3 K27M mutations and loss of nuclear K27-trimethylated histone H3 (H3K27me3) to identify H3 K27M-mutant diffuse midline gliomas.

== Treatment ==
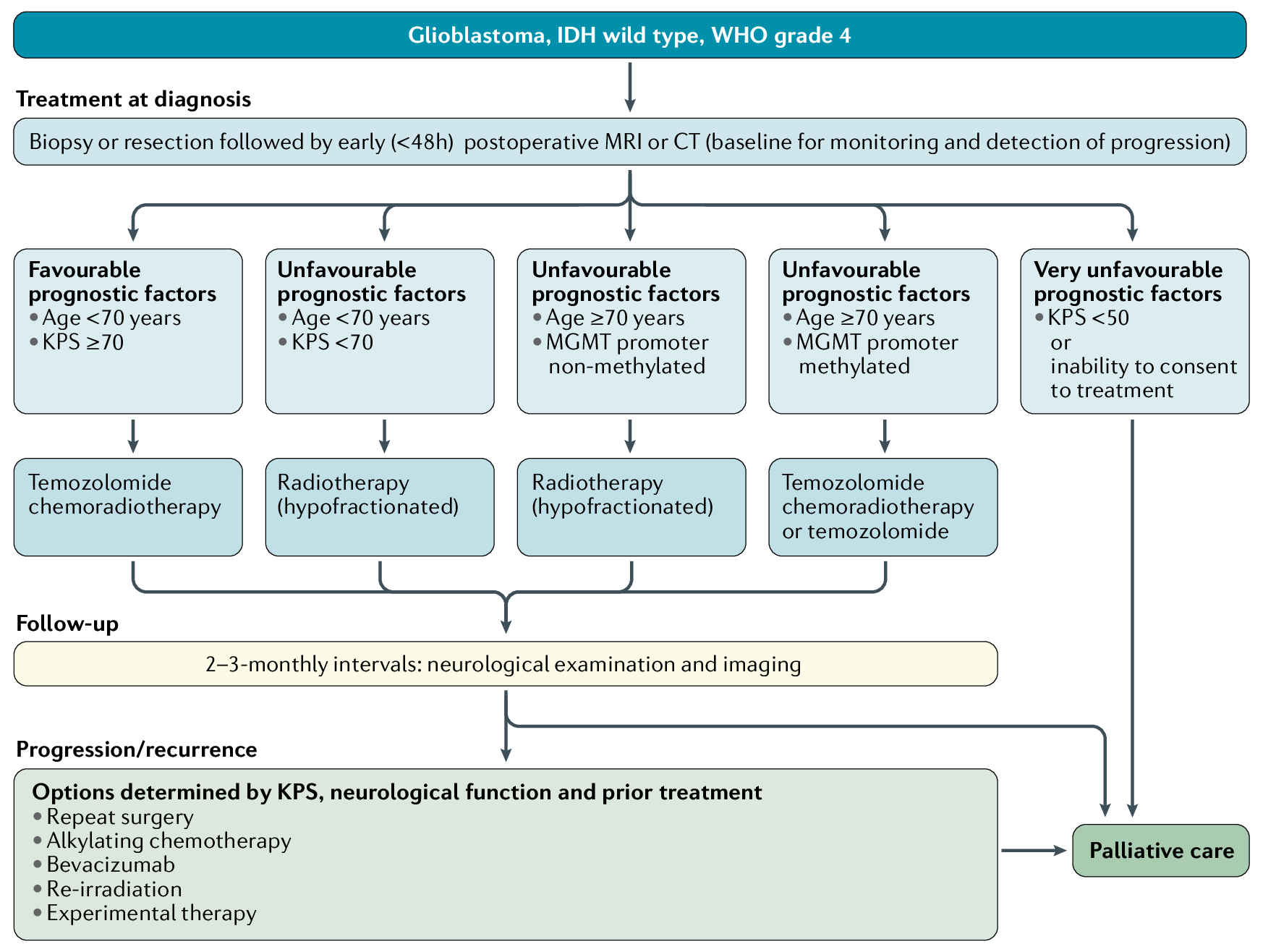
Management of IDH wild type glioblastoma, WHO grade 4. KPS, Karnofsky performance status.

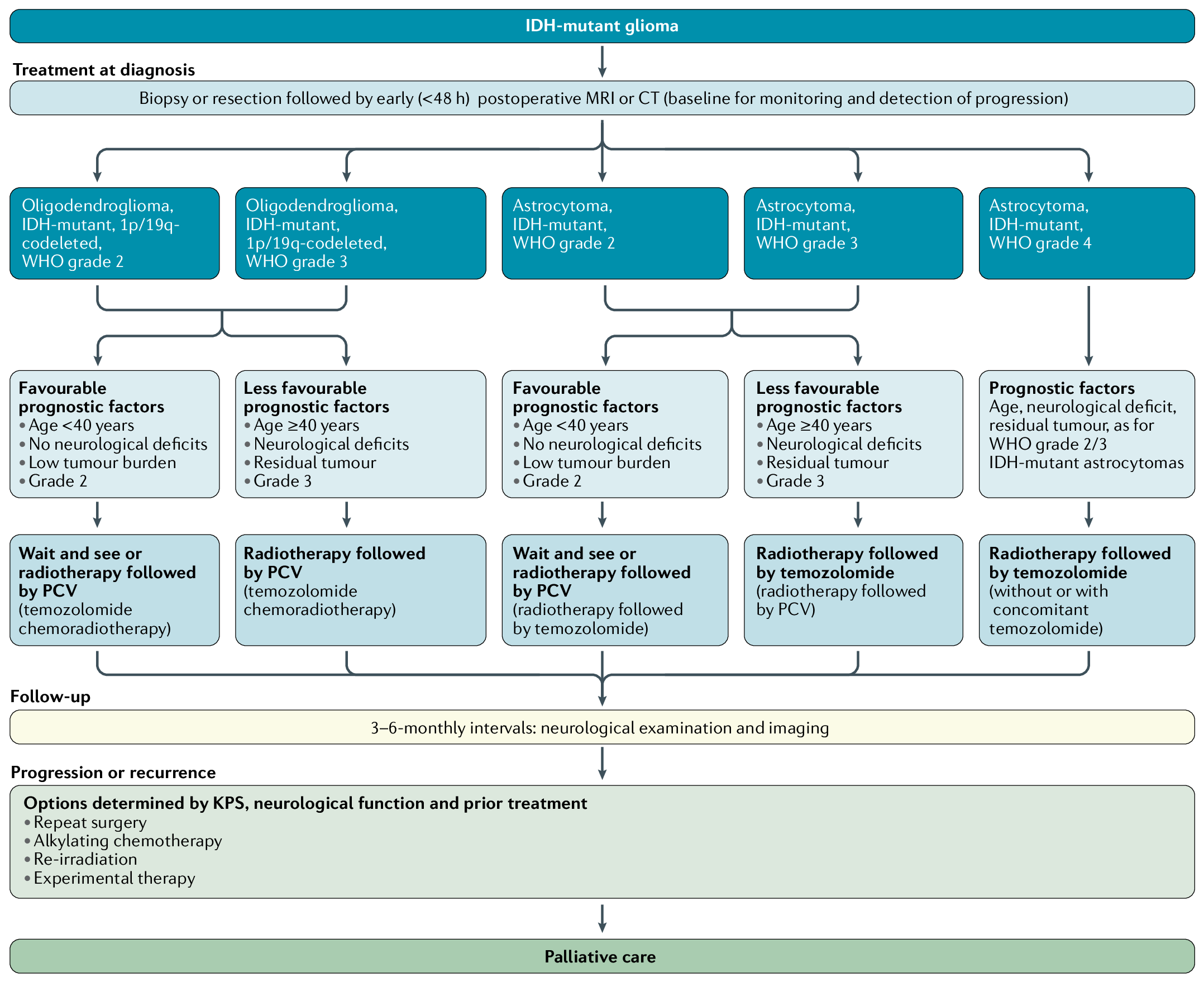
Management of IDH-mutant glioma. KPS, Karnofsky performance status; PCV, procarbazine, lomustine and vincristine.

Treatment for brain gliomas depends on the location, the cell type, and the grade of malignancy. Current treatment options include surgical removal, radiation (radiation therapy), and chemotherapy. In some cases, tumor treating fields (alternating electric field therapy), a recently developed technology, may be used. Often, treatment is a combined approach, using surgery, radiation therapy, and chemotherapy. For many, treatment consists of just surgery, or even "watchful waiting" (waiting to see when an intervention is justified due to tumor progression). Doctors carefully balance the specifics of the patient's tumor and the downsides of intervention, since there can be significant side effects from medical intervention, despite the recent attempts to predict outcomes which have been proposed.

Awake surgery can be performed to monitor for example language and other cognitive functions, as well as motor functions and vision. Awake surgery is known to improve extent of resection while preserving functions and extent of resection is directly associated with survival in low-grade gliomas.

Radiation and chemotherapy remain the mainstays of treatment beyond surgery. Radiation therapy is delivered in the form of external beam radiation or the stereotactic approach using radiosurgery. Temozolomide is a common chemotherapy drug which can be administered easily in an outpatient setting and is able to cross the blood–brain barrier effectively. The IDH inhibitor drug Vorasidenib is the first of its kind to be approved for patients with Grade 2 Astrocytoma and oligodendroglioma with an IDH1 or IDH2 mutation. It was developed by Servier U.S.

There are a wide variety of novel treatments currently being tested in clinical trials, ranging from IDH inhibitors like Ivosidenib, to the recently approved Dendritic cell-based cancer vaccine approach. Treatment using immunotherapy is another promising research path that may help treat glioma in the near future. Experimental therapies like oncolytic viruses have shown potential therapeutic benefits in clinical trials (but have not been approved for use in non-experimental settings).

=== Refractory disease ===
For recurrent high-grade glioblastoma, recent studies have taken advantage of angiogenic blockers such as bevacizumab in combination with conventional chemotherapy, with encouraging results.

=== Relative effectiveness ===
A 2017 meta-analysis compared surgical resection versus biopsy as the initial surgical management option for a person with a low-grade glioma. Results show the evidence is insufficient to make a reliable decision. The relative effectiveness of surgical resection compared to biopsy for people with malignant glioma (high-grade) is unknown.

For high-grade gliomas, a 2003 meta-analysis compared radiotherapy with radiotherapy and chemotherapy. It showed a small but clear improvement from using chemotherapy with radiotherapy. A 2019 meta-analysis suggested that for people with less aggressive gliomas, radiotherapy may increase the risk of long-term neurocognitive side effects. Whilst, evidence is uncertain on whether there are any long-term neurocognitive side effects associated with chemoradiotherapy.

Temozolomide is effective for treating Glioblastoma Multiforme (GBM) compared to radiotherapy alone. A 2013 meta-analysis showed that Temozolomide prolongs survival and delays progression but is associated with an increase in side effects such as blood complications, fatigue, and infection. For people with recurrent GBM, when comparing temozolomide with chemotherapy, there may be an improvement in the time-to-progression and the person's quality of life, but no improvement in overall survival, with temozolomide treatment. Evidence suggests that for people with recurrent high-grade gliomas who have not had chemotherapy before, there are similar survival and time-to-progression outcomes between treatment with temozolomide or the chemotherapy multidrug known as PCV (procarvazine, lomustine and vincristine).

A mutational analysis of 23 initial low-grade gliomas and recurrent tumors from the same patients has challenged the benefits and usage of Temozolomide. The study showed that when lower-grade brain tumors of patients are removed and patients are further treated with Temozolomide, 6 out of 10 times the recurrent tumors were more aggressive and acquired alternative and more mutations. As one of the last authors, Costello, stated "They had a 20 to 50-fold increase in the number of mutations. A patient who received surgery alone who might have had 50 mutations in the initial tumor and 60 in the recurrence. But patients who received TMZ might have 2,000 mutations in the recurrence." Further, new mutations were verified to carry known signatures of Temozolomide induced mutations. The research suggests that the use of Temozolomide for the treatment of certain brain tumors should be thoroughly reviewed. Injudicious usage of Temozolomide might lower the prognosis of the patients further or increase their burden. Further understanding of the mechanisms of Temozolomide-induced mutations and novel combination approaches could be promising.

=== New research directions ===
Newcastle disease has been noted to be helpful in some cases of glioma. Phase III trials with Newcastle Disease Virus Vaccine (MTH-68/H) are expected soon. Strains of Newcastle disease virus have also been used to create viral vector vaccine candidates against Ebola and COVID-19. Torticollis in fowl shows the level of avian severity.

== Prognosis ==
Prognosis of gliomas is given in relation to what grade (as scored by the World Health Organization system) of tumor the patient presents with. Typically, any tumor presenting as above WHO grade I (i.e. a malignant tumor as opposed to a benign tumor) will have a prognosis resulting in eventual death, varying from years (WHO grade II/III) to months (WHO grade IV). Prognosis can also be given based on cellular subtype, which may also impact prognosis.

=== Low grade ===
For low-grade tumors, the prognosis is somewhat more optimistic. Patients diagnosed with a low-grade glioma are 17 times as likely to die as matched patients in the general population. The age-standardized 10-year relative survival rate was 47% according to research in 2014. One study reported that low-grade oligodendroglioma patients have a median survival of 11.6 years; another reported a median survival of 16.7 years. Unfortunately, approximately 70% of low-grade (WHO grade-II) will progress to high-grade tumors within 5–10 years Grade II gliomas, despite often being labeled as benign, are considered a uniformly fatal illness.

=== High grade ===
This group comprises anaplastic astrocytomas and glioblastoma multiforme. Whereas the median overall survival of anaplastic (WHO grade III) gliomas is approximately 3 years, glioblastoma multiforme has a poor median overall survival of c. 15 months.

Postoperative conventional daily radiotherapy improves survival for adults with good functional well‐being and high grade glioma compared to no postoperative radiotherapy. Hypofractionated radiation therapy has similar efficacy for survival as compared to conventional radiotherapy, particularly for individuals aged 60 and older with glioblastoma.

=== Diffuse midline glioma ===
Diffuse midline glioma (DMG), also known as diffuse intrinsic pontine glioma (DIPG), primarily affects children, usually between the ages of 5 and 7. The median survival time with DIPG is under 12 months. Surgery to attempt tumor removal is usually not possible or advisable for pontine gliomas. By their very nature, these tumors invade diffusely throughout the brain stem, growing between normal nerve cells. Aggressive surgery would cause severe damage to neural structures vital for arm and leg movement, eye movement, swallowing, breathing, and even consciousness. Trials of drug candidates have been unsuccessful. The disease is primarily treated with radiation therapy alone as a palliative therapy.

=== IDH1 and IDH2-mutated glioma ===
Patients with glioma carrying mutations in either IDH1 or IDH2 have a relatively favorable survival, compared to patients having glioma with wild-type IDH1/2 genes. In WHO grade III glioma, IDH1/2-mutated glioma have a median prognosis of ~3.5 years, whereas IDH1/2 wild-type glioma perform poorly with a median overall survival of c. 1.5 years.
