= Ali Rezai =

Iranian-born American neurosurgeon

- Born: 1965 (age 60–61); Tehran, Iran
- Citizenship: American
- Education: University of California, Los Angeles (BS); University of Southern California (MD)
- Occupations: Executive Chairman, Rockefeller Neuroscience Institute
- Years active: 1990s-present
- Medical career
- Profession: Neurosurgeon, neuroscientist
- Institutions: Rockefeller Neuroscience Institute, West Virginia University
- Sub-specialties: Neuromodulation, deep brain stimulation, focused ultrasound
- Awards: NANS Lifetime Achievement Award (2023); Ellis Island Medal of Honor (2025)

Ali R. Rezai (born 1965) is an Iranian-born American neurosurgeon and neuroscientist. His work and research has focused on neuromodulation treatments for patients with neurological and mental health conditions, including neuromodulation techniques such as deep brain stimulation (DBS) through brain chip implants to treat Parkinson's disease tremors, obsessive–compulsive disorder, Alzheimer's disease, traumatic brain injury, spinal cord injury, and addiction. Recent research since 2020 has focused on deep brain stimulation for addiction treatment, as well as focused ultrasound to treat essential tremor, addiction and Alzheimer's disease.

He serves as West Virginia University's Associate Dean of Neuroscience, as well as Executive Chair of the Rockefeller Neuroscience Institute (RNI). Earlier in his career, he served as director of New York University's Center for Functional and Restorative Neurosurgery until 2000. He then served as director of the functional neurosurgery program at the Cleveland Clinic until 2009, when he became director of Ohio State University's Neurological Institute. He is the former president of the Congress of Neurological Surgeons, the North American Neuromodulation Society, and the American Society of Stereotactic and Functional Neurosurgery, and serves on the editorial board of several scientific journals including Neurosurgery.

In 2021, Rezai began a new study with trials for low-intensity focused ultrasound (LIFU) as treatment for opioid use disorder (OUD) and substance use disorder (SUD). In January 2024, Rezai and his team at RNI published findings in The New England Journal of Medicine showing results of focused ultrasound treatments for Alzheimer's patients that was featured on 60 Minutes in two January news spots. Rezai also launched a new trial, Low Intensity Focused Ultrasound for Binge Eating Disorder, in 2024 to study the effects of LIFU on binge eating disorder.

== Early life and education ==
Ali R. Rezai was born in 1965 in Tehran, Iran. The oldest of three brothers, he and his family moved to California around 1977. Growing up in Los Angeles, in high school he decided to pursue being a doctor. At age 16, he earned early admission into the University of California-Los Angeles, receiving an undergraduate degree with a major in biology. He subsequently attended the University of Southern California's School of Medicine, graduating with honors with his medical degree in 1990.

From 1990 until 1997 Rezai attended New York University to study the brain, receiving neurosurgical training under the direction of Joseph Ransohoff and Patrick Kelly and beginning to focus on performing surgeries to implant neurostimulation devices in 1995. He completed a residency program at New York University's School of Medicine in 1997. From 1997 until 1998 he completed his subspecialty fellowship in functional neurosurgery at the University of Toronto in Ontario, Canada. He also was briefly a clinical observer in functional neurosurgery at the Karolinska Institute in Stockholm, Sweden. During his training, he studied under and worked with brain specialists such as Michael Apuzzo, Ron Tasker, and Andres Lozano, with a particular focus on functional neurosurgery.

== Career ==
=== NYU and Cleveland Clinic (1998-2009) ===
Rezai was director of the NYU Center for Functional and Restorative Neurosurgery, from 1998 until 2000. At NYU, he was involved with the early use of brain implants and deep brain stimulation (DBS) in the United States to help with diseases such as Parkinson's, a research area he continued pursuing later in his career.

In 2000 he was recruited by the Cleveland Clinic to direct the clinic's functional neurosurgery program and serve as a professor of neurosurgery. He was named the clinic's Jane and Lee Seidman Chair in Functional Neurosurgery. Rezai established and became the inaugural director of the Cleveland Clinic's Center for Neurological Restoration until 2009. During this time, he was involved in a number of clinical trials involving DBS to treat a variety of illnesses. By 2006, Rezai had performed over 900 procedures to implant neurostimulator devices, treating tremors in patients with Parkinson's, as well as pain from migraines and other chronic pain syndromes.

=== Ohio State University (2009-2017) ===
In August 2009 he left Cleveland Clinic to began working at Ohio State University, where he was named the Stanley D. and Joan H. Ross Chair in Neuromodulation and the associate dean for neuroscience. He worked for eight years at the Ohio State University Wexner Medical Center, as well as director of the Ross Center for Brain Health and Performance, where he was responsible for organizing popular science conferences featuring luminaries such as Arianna Huffington, and presentations on brain health and nutrition, lifestyle factors, and light, among others. Rezai was also appointed as director of the Ohio State University Neurological Institute and director of Ohio State's Center for Neuromodulation; a self-directed "hub" for his work on neuromodulation. As of 2025, only the Neuroscience Institute is still in existence.

As part of the neuromodulation center at Ohio State, Rezai was a researcher in clinical trials involving neuromodulation for psychiatric disorders, traumatic brain injury, obesity, Alzheimer's disease, quadriplegia, chronic pain, and headaches among others. Technologies he assisted on developing involved "brain pacemakers" and micro implants, as well as neurological sensors and monitors. By 2017, he was the scientific lead for the medical device company Neurotechnology Innovations Translator.

Also while director of Ohio State's Center for Neuromodulation, in 2011 Rezai started an FDA clinical trial with the intent of implanting a chip to bypass spinal injury and restore limb movement using a brain–computer interface. He and his team were awarded the Annual BCI Research Award for the research in 2016. Rezai also was involved in a clinical trial with "brain pacemakers" to help Alzheimer's patients.

=== West Virginia University Rockefeller Neuroscience Institute (2017-present) ===
In September 2017, Rezai was appointed by West Virginia University (WVU), with the backing of US Senator Jay Rockefeller of the Rockefeller family, as the incoming director of the newly formed Rockefeller Neuroscience Institute (RNI). He was tasked with leading the patient care, research, and education at the institute. The appointment also made him executive chair and vice president of neurosciences for WVU Medicine, as well as WVU Medicine's associate dean and John D. Rockefeller IV professor in neuroscience.

On November 15, 2018, a team of investigators at RNI conducted the nation's first study with a tiny, pill-like micropellet implant made of a non-addictive, non-steroid medication that was placed into a patient's lower back to combat chronic pain caused from sciatica. Also in 2018, Rezai and a team of neuroscientists at WVU began research into wearable technology and a health app that monitors biometrics of patients to detect and predict the progression of neurological and mental health conditions. In 2018, at WVU, Rezai was lead researcher of the first US human FDA trial using focused ultrasound technology to open the blood brain barrier and reduce beta amyloid plaques in Alzheimer's disease.

As principal investigator in a National Institute on Drug Abuse (NIDA) funded study to evaluate deep brain stimulation for treatment of opioid addiction, in 2019, Rezai led a team that surgically implanted a DBS chip into the nucleus accumbens part of the brain to reduce cravings. The operation was a first-in-the-US clinical trial using deep brain stimulation for patients with treatment-resistant opioid use disorder, and garnered the attention of media outlets like BBC and the Washington Post.

He continues to serve as WVU's Associate Dean of Neuroscience, as well as executive chairman and director of the Rockefeller Neuroscience Institute.

== Innovations and research ==
The holder of 60 US patents as of 2023, Rezai is involved with the study and implementation of neuromodulation procedures and devices in academia, government, and business. Rezai specializes in functional neurosurgery, neuromodulation, and "neurosurgical management" of patients with movement disorders, chronic pain and "neurobehavioral psychiatric disorders." Much of his research, papers and patents involve neuromodulation, deep brain stimulation (DBS), neurostimulation and focused ultrasound technology to treat disorders such as Parkinson's, Alzheimer's, and addiction.

He has also studied and developed monitoring technology for a variety of public health purposes. By 2024, he had been a principal or co-investigator on eight grants funded by the National Institutes of Health.

In November 2025, Rezai oversaw the launch of the first "Brain Health Collaboratory" at RNI, merging clinical care, AI-powered research, and continuous data generation to accelerate the discovery and delivery of non-drug neurotherapies. Integrated into RNI’s clinical workflows, Spectris, Cognito Therapeutics’ investigative at-home neuroprotective device, incorporates non-invasive gamma frequency light and sound stimulation to evoke brain activity patterns associated with learning and memory.

=== Deep brain stimulation ===
While at NYU in the late 1990s, Rezai was involved with the early use of brain implants and deep brain stimulation (DBS) in the United States to help with diseases such as Parkinson's. While working with the Cleveland Clinic in the early 2000s, he continued to be involved in a number of clinical trials involving DBS.

In 2005, he took part in the first DBS procedure done on a patient with a brain injury who was in a minimally conscious state. Around that time he was also part of a trial to treat chronic obsessive compulsive disorder with DBS, with the results published in 2006 in Neuropsychopharmacology. He was furthermore the lead surgeon in a procedure to use DBS to help with chronic depression. Popular Science described the procedure as a success in 2007.

On May 3, 2016, at the Ohio State University Wexner Medical Center, surgeons performed brain stimulation surgery using an electrical lead attached to a pacemaker to control tremors from Parkinson's disease.

Rezai was the principal investigator in a 2019 National Institute on Drug Abuse funded study to evaluate the safety and feasibility of deep brain stimulation for treatment of opioid addiction. As part of the study, with Rezai as lead doctor, on November 1, 2019, a team surgically implanted a DBS chip into the nucleus accumbens part of the human brain to reduce cravings for drugs, particularly opioids. The patient had been a drug abuser since a young age, and the first of four patients in a pilot program aimed at a small percentage of patients with treatment-resistant cravings for opioids. The operation was a first-in-the-US clinical trial using deep brain stimulation for patients with treatment-resistant opioid use disorder. None of the four male patients had serious adverse events in response to the implants, according to a study published in 2023.

=== Brain computer interface for movement ===
While director of Ohio State's Center for Neuromodulation, in 2011 Rezai started an FDA clinical trial in collaboration with scientists at Battelle Research Institute with the intent of implanting a chip to bypass spinal injury and restore limb movement. With the system involving a brain–computer interface, Rezai performed the first implantation in 2014. In 2016, the medical team reported that the patient had regained some functional use of his right hand and fingers, publishing the results in Nature. The procedure was featured in the New York Times, Wall Street Journal, and the Financial Times, and was purported to be a technological breakthrough in neural engineering, serving as the first ever account of "limb reanimation."

=== HIFU neuromodulation for Alzheimer's and Parkinson's ===
In 2016 while at Ohio State, Rezai and his team were among several centers in the US performing a procedure to reduce tremors from essential tremor and Parkinson's disease with high intensity focused ultrasound (HIFU).

With Rezai as lead researcher, in 2018, the Rockefeller Neuroscience Institute was chosen as the initial site in the US for an FDA-approved clinical trial using low intensity magnetic resonance–guided focused ultrasound (MRgFUS), for treatment of Alzheimer's disease. That October, he began overseeing the trial to use MRgFUS to open the blood-brain barrier (BBB) with the aim of improving brain function and clearing beta-amyloid plaques in the brain.

There were reports in 2019 and again in 2021 suggesting the treatment was safe, and in 2022, Rezai and the research team reported that "clinical trial participants in the early stages of Alzheimer's disease saw a modest reduction in beta-amyloid plaques." They were still testing if the results would be "enough to help the patient long term."

In January 2024, Rezai and his team at RNI published findings in The New England Journal of Medicine showing that the opening of the blood-brain barrier using focused ultrasound increased removal of amyloid-beta (Aβ) plaques in Alzheimer's disease patients undergoing anti amyloid-beta (Aβ) antibody treatment. 60 Minutes featured the research, Rezai, and his team in two January 2024 news segments.

=== LIFU neuromodulation for addiction ===
In 2021, Rezai, as principal investigator, oversaw the launch of a new trial of low-intensity focused ultrasound for the treatment of opioid use disorder and substance use disorder. Highly addictive drugs, such as opioids and methamphetamines, flood the nucleus accumbens with the feel-good neurotransmitter dopamine, which can hijack the brain's reward system, and trap people into compulsive cycles. Focused ultrasound neuromodulation aims to reset the activity in the nucleus accumbens to help break the connection between the brain and addiction.

In the clinical trial LIFU for Treatment for Refractory Opioid Use Disorder, Rezai investigates non-invasive sound waves for SUD, applying LIFU neuromodulation to treat severe OUD. Unlike deep brain stimulation, which uses surgically implanted electrodes, focused ultrasound uses sound waves to modulate deep brain circuits without surgery. The 20-minute procedure directs multiple sound waves through the skull and brain, converging on a specific brain target to modulate neural activity. While the precise mechanisms generating these effects remain unclear, of the 50 clinical trial patients treated at RNI with the technology through August 2026, patients with SUD reported an average of 80% reduction in cravings, and binge eating disorder (BED) patients report an average of 90% craving reductions. Rezai launched a new trial in October 2024, Low Intensity Focused Ultrasound for Binge Eating Disorder, to continue through 2027.

Rezai anticipates that the modality could be performed by trained physicians, rather than only by highly-specialized neurosurgeons, and Wired reports that Rezai's team is exploring ways to make the technology more portable and accessible. His LIFU neuromodulation research has led to focused ultrasound clinical trials at multiple U.S. universities, as well as internationally, including in Canada, South Korea and Israel.

=== Biometric monitoring, prediction of neurological disorders ===
In 2018, Rezai and a team of neuroscientists at WVU began research into technology that "continuously monitors the human operating system," with the use of wearable devices, apps, and AI programs used to predict, detect, and monitor various disorders. The wearable devices measure sleep patterns, heart rate, other physiological functions, nervous system changes, as well as "psychological and behavioral factors." In 2020 during the COVID-19 pandemic in West Virginia, Rezai and the team used this technology help identify and predict symptoms of viral infections, publishing a paper on the project in 2021. By 2021, the wearable technology had also been used by Rezai and the team for the detection of stress or cravings in people with drug addictions. Papers on the research were published in 2021 and 2023.

== Society positions ==
Rezai was on the executive committee of the Congress of Neurological Surgeons from 2002 until 2013. He served as their Annual Meeting Program chairman in 2010, and as the organization's president in 2013. He was on the board of directors of the International Society of Reconstructive Neurosurgery from 2005 until 2013. He served as president of the American Society of Stereotactic and Functional Neurosurgery from June 2010 until June 2012, and as the organization's vice-president from 2008 until 2010. From 2011 to 2013, Rezai was president of the North American Neuromodulation Society. He was also on their board of directors from 2004 until 2013, and chairman of the organization's Annual Meeting Scientific Program from 2009 until 2011. In 2026, Rezai joined the advisory panel of the West Virginia Department of Health's Rural Health Transformation Program.

== Publishing and editing ==
As of 2023, Rezai was the author of over 300 peer-reviewed scientific publications with an h-index of 105, including in journals such as Nature, Lancet Neurology, JAMA Neurology, and PNAS. He has published around 40 book chapters and was the co-editor of the textbook Neuromodulation in 2009, as well as the editor for a book on surgery for psychiatric disorders. His work, particularly his neuromodulation research, has been featured in publications such as the Wall Street Journal, New York Times, U.S. News & World Report, USA Today, MIT Technology Review, Reader's Digest, The Los Angeles Times, Chicago Tribune, The Globe and Mail, and TIME.

He served on the editorial boards of multiple scientific journals, including Neurosurgery, Bioelectronic Medicine, Stereotactic and Functional Neurosurgery, Neuromodulation and Neurological Research. In 2003, he was the editor of Neurosurgery for Psychiatric Disorders, a medical journal published by Neurosurgery Clinics of North America. In 2006 he was a co-editor on "Deep brain stimulation for Parkinson's disease", a journal supplement to Movement Disorders. He was subsequently a co-editor on a World Neurosurgery journal supplement in 2013.

== Speaking and presentations ==
As of 2023, Rezai reported having given over 500 lectures, including at events such as SXSW and TED. He has appeared in live radio and television broadcasts in outlets such as 60 Minutes, CNN, NPR, PBS, BBC, MSNBC, ABC, NBC, The Discovery Channel, Good Morning America, HBO, and others. On multiple occasions he has presented to members of US government. In 2007 this included including presenting his research to the US president and members of the US Senate and House of Representatives. He has also presented information to four state governors.

Government presentations

- "Brain Pacemakers" - Presentation to US President George W. Bush (2007)
- "Traumatic Brain Injury: Diagnosis and Treatment" - Presentation on Capitol Hill to members of the United States Senate and House of Representatives (June 27, 2007)
- "Deep Brain Stimulation" - Presentation to Ohio Governor Ted Strickland, Cleveland Clinic (February 7, 2008)
- "Traumatic Brain Injury: Implications" - Social Security Administration Hearing, Washington, D.C. (November 18, 2008)
- "Neurological Innovations" - Presentation to Cleveland Mayor Frank G. Jackson (April 6, 2009)
- "Neuromodulation Overview" - Presentation to Ohio Governor John Kasich, Ohio State University Medical Center (December 2, 2011)
- "Neuromodulation and chronic disease" - Presentation to the Cabinet of the Governor of Ohio, Ohio Statehouse (January 20, 2012)

== Honors and awards ==
In 1997, he earned a Congress of Neurological Surgeons Clinical Fellowship Award and the Bottrell Neurosurgical Award in Neurosurgery. The American Association of Neurological Surgeons awarded him its William H. Sweet Investigator Award in 1998. The American Psychiatric Association gave him its Best Paper of the Year award in 2004. In 2011, he won the Columbus Business First Innovator of the Year Award/Health Care Heroes. He was listed in Castle Connolly's Guide to America's Top Doctors from 2000 until 2023 and received a North American Neuromodulation Society Lifetime Achievement Award in 2023. Rezai received the NIH HEAL Award for Excellence in Research in 2024, the Ellis Island Medal of Honor in 2025 and, in 2026, the Big 12 Faculty Award for his contribution to advancing neuroscience and mental health on an international scale.
