= Michael L. J. Apuzzo =

American academic neurological surgeon

Michael L.J. Apuzzo
- Born: May 22, 1940 (age 86); New Haven, Connecticut, United States
- Education: Yale College; Boston University School of Medicine; McGill University; U.S. Naval Submarine Medical Research Laboratory; Yale School of Medicine
- Medical career
- Profession: Academic Neurosurgeon
- Research: Advanced Neurosurgery, Cerebral Surgery; Operative technique, Surgical Minimalism

Michael L. J. Apuzzo (born May 22, 1940) is an American academic neurological surgeon, the Edwin M. Todd/Trent H. Wells, Jr. Professor Emeritus of Neurological Surgery and Radiation Oncology, Biology, and Physics at the Keck School of Medicine, of the University of Southern California. He is also editor emeritus of the peer-reviewed journals World Neurosurgery and Neurosurgery. He is distinguished adjunct professor of neurosurgery at the Yale School of Medicine, distinguished professor of advanced neurosurgery and neuroscience and senior advisor, at the Neurological Institute, Wexner Medical School, The Ohio State University, and adjunct professor of neurosurgery, Weill Cornell Medicine, Department of Neurological Surgery & Weill Cornell Brain and Spine Center.

== Early life and education ==
Apuzzo is the son of a maritime family with roots in Amalfi, Italy (Dominic John Apuzzo, a precision machinist and craftsman) and Vienna, Austria (Ann Janet Lorenz, a registered nurse). Born in New Haven, Connecticut where he attended the Hopkins Grammar School, continued his academic studies at Yale College and obtained his medical degree at the Boston University. After completing his general surgery training at McGill's Royal Victoria Hospital in Montreal, he returned to the Yale School of Medicine to complete his neurosurgical residency at Yale New Haven Hospital, West Haven Veteran's Administration Hospital, and Hartford Hospital, along with fellowships in neurophysiology and neuro-pathology. During that time, Apuzzo obtained training in nuclear, submarine and deep sea diving medical specialties at the Naval Submarine Base New London in Groton, Connecticut.

== Military service ==
Following training in Groton, Connecticut, he served as a medical and deep sea diving officer on the USS Robert E. Lee (SSBN-601), one of the original five nuclear-powered fleet ballistic missile submarines as a part of submarine Squadron 14 based in Holy Loch, Scotland. This squadron was assigned to implement the deterrent mission of NATO (North Atlantic Treaty Organization), serving as a submarine platform for sixteen Polaris A-3 multiple nuclear warhead intercontinental ballistic missiles. This duty consisted of multiple 90- to 120-day submerged patrols to polar regions, the Mediterranean Sea, and Black Sea.

== Professional life ==
He joined the faculty at the University of Southern California School of Medicine in 1973, where he established a central nervous system immunology and cellular biology laboratory. There, he primarily focused on brain diseases such as tumors, epilepsy, Parkinson's disease and neuropsychiatric disorders. At the Los Angeles County General Hospital, he developed early refinements of microsurgical techniques for the management of intracranial neoplasms. Specifically, he described and advocated complex midline transcerebral microsurgical corridors to the brain's centrally located third ventricle, which ultimately resulted in popularizing these approaches internationally. He helped establish the microscope as a regular and essential component of the general neurosurgical armamentarium. He was appointed Professor in 1980.

Currently, Apuzzo is the Edwin M. Todd/Trent H. Wells, Jr. Professor Emeritus of Neurological Surgery and Radiation Oncology, Biology, and Physics at the Keck School of Medicine, of the University of Southern California, distinguished adjunct professor of neurosurgery at the Yale School of Medicine, distinguished professor of advanced neurosurgery and neuroscience and senior advisor, at the Neurological Institute, Wexner Medical School, The Ohio State University, and adjunct professor of neurosurgery, Weill Cornell Medicine, Department of Neurological Surgery & Weill Cornell Brain and Spine Center. He was director of Neurosurgery at the Kenneth Norris, Jr. Cancer Hospital and Research Institute, senior clinical director of surgical neuro-oncology, and director of the Gamma Unit Facility at the USC University Hospital and neurosurgical director of the Norris CyberKnife Facility at the Norris Hospital.

== Clinical and research activities ==
Apuzzo was a leader in the development and employment of imaging directed stereotactic neurosurgery in 1979. In the laboratory and clinic, he developed and refined prototype stereotactic systems and technical adjuvants. These created a mode of intracranial navigation at a new level of precision and safety. He introduced the computer as an intraoperative neurosurgical tool and reintroduced intracranial endoscopy as a technical adjunct. Though not primarily a radiosurgeon, he introduced and developed rotational dynamic radiosurgery techniques and performed the first procedure in America using these methods for brain tumors, arteriovenous malformations, and functional disorders. Later, he worked to refine and popularize the use of fixed beam systems.

He studied functional restoration in the central nervous system and performed North America's first human stereotactic cerebral grafting research procedure for the amelioration of Parkinsonism. He conceived the term‚ 'cellular and molecular neuro-surgery' and promoted the amalgam of molecular biology and neurosurgery in the comprehension and management of neurological diseases. He developed the concept of minimally invasive neurosurgery and played a primary role in the investigation and application of vagal nerve stimulation for the management of intractable epilepsy. This method of treatment was subsequently applied to multiple neurofunctional and psychiatric disorders.

He has worked as a special consultant to the National Aeronautics and Space Administration (NASA) through the Jet Propulsion Laboratory (JPL) and the Cape Kennedy-Canaveral Facilities.

He has raised awareness of the role of nanotechnology as a neurosurgical adjuvant. He has worked in the area of advanced and specialized operating room design, as well as the concept of virtual environments for surgical simulation.

== Publications and editorships ==
Apuzzo has made over 800 contributions to the scientific literature on surgical techniques, methods, and concepts as they apply to disorders of the human cerebrum. Major independent volumes have included: Surgery of the Third Ventricle (1987, 1998) Brain Surgery: Complication Avoidance and Management (1992), and Surgery of the Human Cerebrum (2009). Predominant themes have included surgical minimalism, technology transfer and the implementation of advanced technologies to the therapy of brain diseases.

In 1991, he was appointed editor-in-chief of the peer-reviewed journal Neurosurgery. He established the web-based "Neurosurgery-Online" and later "Operative Neurosurgery" during his term as editor-in-chief. When he completed his term in 2009, he was asked to found the society sponsored peer-reviewed journal "World Neurosurgery" and "worldneurosurgery.org" by the World Federation of Neurosurgical Societies (WFNS) until January 2015, when he stepped down.

In 2015, he was the new editor of World Neurosurgery. In 2021, he co-published "Applications of augmented reality in the neurosurgical operating room: A systematic review of the literature" in the Journal of Clinical Neuroscience. In 2023, he is on the editorial board of the Chinese Neurosurgical Journal.

== Internationalism and education ==
He has served as an advocate for international exchange of ideas. In 1989, as scientific program chair, he introduced an increased presence of international faculty and participation in the American Association of Neurological Surgeons (AANS) Annual Meeting in New Orleans, Louisiana. This practice was subsequently developed and perpetuated by the major North American neurosurgical groups in succeeding decades. As editor of Neurosurgery, he established an extensive international advisory board and increased international participation in the review and publication processes.

He subsequently traveled actively internationally initiating idea exchange and the sharing of information globally both personally and through the exploitation of digital technologies early in their availability. He subsequently was awarded membership in more than 25 international organizations. Based on these contributions, he was awarded the Founders' Laurel Award by the Congress of Neurological Surgeons (CNS) at their annual meeting in 2014.

"The CNS Founders' Laurel Award is awarded to a unique individual who has made exceptional life long contributions in education and mentorship.
Dr. Apuzzo is an iconic figure in neurosurgery whose illustrious career over the past forty years exemplifies the principles this award represents.
His educational contributions have been many. Since the late 70’s, Dr. Apuzzo has consistently provided new ideas and concepts that have played a key role in the evolution of neurosurgical education and practiced worldwide. He has been involved in numerous key educational initiatives of the Congress of Neurological Surgeons (CNS), American Association of Neurological Surgeons (AANS), The Society of Neurological Surgeons (SNS), American Academy of Neurological Surgery, The Society of University Neurosurgeons (SUN), and others groups worldwide.
In the late 80’s and 90’s, he played an important role in redesigning the structure and templates of our meeting’s as we know it today initially the American Association of Neurological Surgeons (AANS)and subsequently the Congress of Neurological Surgeons (CNS) and this is the foundation of upon which our meeting structures are in place today.
Dr. Apuzzo has made an indelible impact also on the training and thinking on over 100 neurosurgical residents at the University of Southern California and countless other trainees and students around the globe."

— Founders' Laurel Award Presentation, Congress of Neurological Surgeons, Boston 2014 by Dr. Ali Rezai (past president of the Congress of Neurological Surgeons)

== Sports ==
He has served as the principal neurosurgical consultant for the University of Southern California Trojans Athletic Department and the New York Football Giants, as well as a consultant to the National Football League's NFL Commissioner and the NFL committee on head and spinal trauma. Additionally, he has served as adviser to the National Football League's Committee on Head Injury. He has also been a consultant to the activities of various teams and clubs of NFL, the Major League Baseball (MLB), the National Hockey League (NHL) and the National Basketball Association (NBA).

Beginning in 1978, based on the legacy of University of Michigan's Richard C. Schnieder, he initiated activities to establish the role of neurosurgery in the arena of organized sport. Initially, at the University of Southern California, he established an active role in the areas of head protection, injury prevention, assessment and treatment with athletic trainer Byron Hansen and later Russ Romano and a succession of coaches and athletic directors at that institution. Subsequently, he worked to establish injury management protocols with the National Institutes of Health (NIH) and NFL.

As editor of Neurosurgery, he established a section on sport which focused on traumatic brain injury in all sports. Later, as special adviser to the National Football League Committee on traumatic brain injury, he worked to establish injury prevention recognition and management protocols that are now adopted under the Commissioners Paul Tagliabue and Roger Goodell. In later years, his relationship with the NFL as a special consultant to the New York Giants while acting as editor-in-chief of the journal came under question in investigations led by PBS and the New York Times. In particular, the NFL's Mild Traumatic Brain Injury Committee had published all 13 of its publications in Neurosurgery as he maintained professional and financial ties to the organization, and over the objections of reviewers.

In 2000, he was the editor of Neurosurgery, when the "medical journal published controversial NFL articles," according to Sports Business Daily. The controversial papers involved head injuries and symptoms among NFL players, which some academics argued were more severe than was reflected in the publications, including under Apuzzo as editor of Neurosurgery, where the articles were published. In 2018, he and four other doctors associated with the NFL were sued by insurers for access to documentation regarding player wellbeing and head injuries.

== Recognition ==
Apuzzo has served as honored guest laureate for the Congress of Neurological Surgeons. He was awarded the William Beecher Scoville Prize for neurosurgery by the World Federation of Neurosurgical Societies (WFNS). He was awarded the Van Heck Prize by the Belgian National Foundation for Scientific Research for work in the treatment of untreatable diseases. He has been honored by the World Health Organization (WHO), World Federation of Neurosurgical Societies, Queen Sophia of Spain with the Sixto Obrador Medal, and Sweden's National Center for Research and Higher Education in Medicine, the Karolinska Institutet, with the Herbert Olivecrona Award. He received a Doctorate honoris pro causa from the 85-member Italian National University Consortium administered by the Suor Orsola Benincasa University of Naples. He received the University Medal from Boston University for unusual contributions to the field of medicine and the advancement of surgery of the central nervous system and the Gold Medal from the University of Messina in Italy for his contributions to neurosurgery, medicine, internationalization and humanities. He is the recipient of Norway's Vilhelm Magnus Medal and Italy's Francesco Durante International Prize. The Congress of Neurological Surgeons had established the "Michael L. J. Apuzzo Lecture on Creativity and Innovation" as a keynote lecture at its annual meeting. The "Apuzzo Prize for Creativity and Innovation" has been established at both the Boston University and Keck Schools of Medicine. He is the 2014 recipient of the Congress of Neurological Surgeons' "Founders Laurel Award". He was honored by the Ohio State University with a Doctor of Science degree in May 2015.

"The Ohio State University salutes Michael L.J. Apuzzo. It is difficult to overstate the importance of the contributions Dr. Michael L.J. Apuzzo has made to the field of neurosurgery.
A remarkably innovative clinician, scientist and scholar, he has become an international icon for his groundbreaking scientific discoveries and for this use of cutting-edge technologies to redefine neurosurgical practice.
His tireless dedication and pioneering spirit have earned him recognition as one of the world's most renowned neurosurgeons.
In recognition of these outstanding achievements, The Ohio State University confers upon him the degree of Doctor of Science Honoris causa, May 10, 2015."

— Honoree Commencement Dinner, The Ohio State University, May 2015, Columbus, Ohio by Michael V. Drake, M.D., president of the Ohio State University

In May 2009, the University of Southern California's Department of Neurological Surgery and the Keck School of Medicine established the Michael L.J. Apuzzo Professorship for Advanced Neurological Surgery. The professorship is endowed by Ernest A. Bates.

On May 6, 2022, the Department of Neurosurgery at Yale hosted the inaugural Michael L. J. Apuzzo lecture for the first time, to honor Apuzzo. He received an honorary degree in 2023 from WVU.

== See also ==
- World Neurosurgery
- List of Hopkins School people
