= Herbert Olivecrona =

Swedish professor and brain surgeon

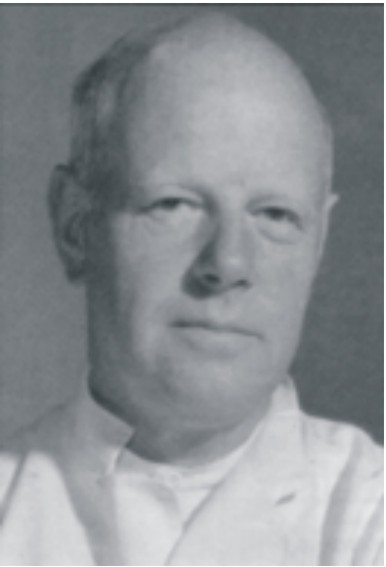
Herbert Olivecrona

Axel Herbert Olivecrona (July 11, 1891 – January 1980) was a Swedish professor and brain surgeon, credited with founding the field of Swedish neurosurgery, and pioneering developments in modern neurosurgery.

== Family, early life and education ==
Herbert Olivecrona was born July 11, 1891, in Visby, Sweden, the son of Axel Olivecrona, a district court judge, and Countess Ebba Cristina Mörner af Morlanda. His brother Karl Olivecrona was a noted Swedish legal scholar, and his son Gustaf Olivecrona was a Swedish writer and journalist.

In his youth, he was playing elite bandy. He was part of the IFK Uppsala bandy team, which in 1912 played a draw in the final against Djurgårdens IF and shared the Swedish championship that year.

Originally attending school in Uppsala, he began studying medicine at the University of Uppsala in 1909, then transferring to Karolinska Institutet, where he was an assistant in Pathology. He graduated in 1918.

== Medical career ==
In 1919, Olivecrona received a fellowship from the American-Scandinavian Foundation. This allowed him to engage in experimental work at the Johns Hopkins Institute in Baltimore, Maryland, where he worked with surgery pioneer Harvey Cushing (1869–1939). Olivecrona was offered a residency, and to be Cushing's foreign assistant on the condition that he work for a year at Pierre Marie's clinic in Paris. Due to financial reasons, Olivecrona declined and returned to Sweden, where, as the only neurosurgeon in the city interested in brain tumors, he established the first neurosurgery program at Serafimer Hospital in the 1920s. After further consultation with Cushing, Olivecrona improved his skills, and in 1930 was promoted to the position of assistant surgeon in chief, allowing him to establish a 50-bed neurosurgery department.

In 1935, he became the first professor of neurosurgery at the Karolinska Institute, quite likely the first chair of neurosurgery in all of Europe. Olivecrona was a pioneer in the creation of specific surgical techniques for certain types of brain lesions such as acoustic neuromas, arteriovenous malformations, and berry aneurysms, becoming one of the key neurosurgical instructors in Europe. One of his students, Lars Leksell (1907–1986), went on to make major advances in the development of echoencephalography, and is credited with the invention of radiosurgery.

Among his most famous patients was the Hungarian writer Frigyes Karinthy, whose brain tumor he operated on in 1936. Karinthy put it into a novel titled "A Journey Round my Skull."

In 1955, Olivecrona was elected as a member of the Royal Swedish Academy of Sciences. He retired from the Karolinska in 1960 and went into private practice, during which time he also accepted an invitation to travel to Cairo and establish a neurosurgical unit in Egypt. He later co-wrote a neurosurgical handbook, Handbuch der Neurochirugie. Olivecrona died in January 1980.

== Legacy ==
The Herbert Olivecrona Award, also known as the "Nobel Prize of Neurosurgery", is awarded annually by the Karolinska Institute to a neurosurgeon or neuroscientist who has made an outstanding contribution to the neurosurgical field.

Recipients of the Herbert Olivecrona Award by year:

- John F. Mullan, 1976
- Charles G. Drake, 1977
- M. Gazi Yaşargil, 1978
- Leonard I Malis, 1979
- Lindsay Symon, 1980
- Charles B. Wilson, 1982
- Peter J. Jannetta, 1983
- Kenichiro Sugita, 1984
- John A. Jane, 1985
- Majid Samii, 1987
- William H. Sweet, 1989
- Graham Teasdale, 1991
- Keiji Sano, 1992
- Emil Pasztor, 1993
- Alan Crockard, 1995
- Vinko Dolenc, 1996
- Takanori Fukushima, 1997
- Michael Apuzzo, 1998
- Robert F. Spetzler, 1999
- Albert Rhoton Jr., 2000
- Patrick J. Kelly, 2001
- Nicolas de Tribolet, 2002
- Matti Vapalahti, 2003
- Alexander N. Konovalov, 2004
- Björn Meyerson, 2005
- Niels-Aage Svendgaard, 2005
- Cornelius A. F. Tulleken, 2006
- Ross M. Bullock, 2007
- Bernard George, 2008
- Michael Fehlings, 2009
- Hugues Duffau (fr), 2010
- Ossama al-Mefty, 2011
- Andres Lozano, 2012
- Marianne Juhler, 2013
- Peter J.A. Hutchinson, 2015
- P. David Adelson, 2016
- L. Dade Lunsford, 2017
- Ali Fadl Krisht, 2019

== Selected works ==
- An experimental study of the circulatory failure in peritonitis (Academical treatise), 1922
- Congenital arteriovenous aneurysms of the carotid and vertebral arterial systems, 1957
