= Albert Rhoton Jr. =

American neurosurgeon and professor

- Born: November 18, 1932
- Died: February 21, 2016 (aged 83); Gainesville, Florida
- Education: Ohio State University; Washington University School of Medicine
- Years active: 1960s-2016
- Medical career
- Profession: Neurosurgeon, neuroscientist, inventor
- Institutions: University of Florida Professor of Surgery and the Chairman of the Department of Neurological Surgery
- Sub-specialties: Microsurgery, brain mapping
- Notable works: Cranial Anatomy and Surgical Approaches

Albert Loren Rhoton Jr., (November 18, 1932 – February 21, 2016) was an American neurosurgeon and a professor specializing in microsurgical neuroanatomy. He was on the editorial boards of six surgical journals, and worked as professor and chairman of the Department of Neurological Surgery at the University of Florida. He was also president of organizations the American Association of Neurological Surgeons, and other surgical organizations.

A pioneer in the field of neuroanatomy, Rhoton was a leader in expanding knowledge of the anatomy of the human brain. He used the surgical microscope to map the brain's intricate blood vessel network and revealed previously unknown connections between vital centers of the brain. At the University of Florida, he built the world's largest collection of three-dimensional images of the brain and published the best selling neurosurgical textbook, Cranial Anatomy and Surgical Approaches, both of which serve as guides for neurosurgeons across the globe.

He developed and introduced a number of microsurgical techniques that improved the safety and effectiveness of neurosurgery, including the use of the surgical microscope in neurosurgery. He also designed many of the commonly used microneurosurgical instruments, for example, the Rhoton Micro Dissectors designed for delicate work in the treatment of brain aneurysms and tumor resection.

== Early life and education ==
Rhoton was born on November 18, 1932, in the small town of Parvin, Kentucky. He grew up in a log cabin without plumbing or electricity in rural eastern Kentucky. His family moved to Akron, Ohio during the Second World War where his father was a rubber chemist.

Rhoton earned his bachelor degree in social work before entering a premedical program at the Ohio State University. He graduated from the Washington University School of Medicine in St. Louis in 1959 with the top academic standing in his class. He then completed two years of training at Columbia-Presbyterian Medical Center in New York City, one year in general surgery and the other in neurological surgery. He returned to Washington University and completed his neurosurgery residency at Barnes Hospital under Henry Schwartz in 1964. He remained at Washington University for a one-year National Institutes of Health research fellowship in neuroanatomy, during which time he began to use the surgical microscope in his research, realizing its potential to advance surgical techniques and the understanding of brain anatomy.

== Career ==
Rhoton began as a staff neurosurgeon at the Mayo Clinic in Rochester, Minnesota, in 1966. He joined the University of Florida in 1972 as a Professor of Surgery and the Chairman of the Department of Neurological Surgery. He began to teach microneurosurgery at the University of Florida in 1975. He became the university's R.D. Keene Family Professor of Neurosurgery in 1981. At the University of Florida, Rhoton Jr. built the world's largest collection of three-dimensional images of the brain, used internationally by neurosurgeons. In 2003, through Neurosurgery, he published the world's best selling neurosurgical textbook, Cranial Anatomy and Surgical Approaches, which serves as a guide for neurosurgeons. In 2014 Rhoton was the director of the Neuro-Microanatomy Lab at the McKnight Brain Institute at the University of Florida.

== Research ==
=== Microsurgical techniques ===
Specializing in microsurgical neuroanatomy, he developed and introduced a number of microsurgical techniques that improved the safety and effectiveness of neurosurgery.

He is internationally recognized as the "father of microscopic neurosurgery" for his neuroanatomical studies, which provided the anatomic basis for the development of modern neurosurgical techniques and revolutionized surgical approaches to many neurological disorders, including those for acoustic neuromas and skull base tumors.

He developed and introduced a number of microsurgical techniques that improved the safety and effectiveness of neurosurgery, including the use of the surgical microscope in neurosurgery.

He ultimately developed over 200 neurosurgical instruments, many of which bear his name. One of the tools in use worldwide is the Rhoton Micro Dissector which is designed for delicate work in the treatment of brain aneurysms and tumor resection.

== Professional activities ==
Rhoton served as the President of the American Association of Neurological Surgeons, the Congress of Neurological Surgeons, the Society of Neurological Surgeons, the North American Skull Base Society, the International Interdisciplinary Congress on Craniofacial and Skull Base Surgery, the Florida Neurosurgical Society, and the International Society for Neurosurgical Technology and Instrument Invention. He served as the honored guest or was elected to honorary membership in more than 20 neurosurgical societies throughout Africa, Asia, Australia, Europe, and North and South America.

== Awards ==
- 1981, Distinguished Faculty Award, University of Florida
- 1984, Alumni Achievement Award, Washington University School of Medicine
- 1993, Honored Guest, Congress of Neurological Surgeons
- 1997, Jamieson Medal and Lecturer, Neurosurgical Society of Australasia
- 1998, Harvey Cushing Medal, American Association of Neurological Surgeons
- 2000, Herbert Olivecrona Award, Karolinska Institutet, the "Nobel Prize of Neurosurgery"
- 2001, Medal of Honor, World Federation of Neurosurgical Societies
- 2001, Medal of Honor, Neurosurgical Society of America
- 2002, Lifetime Achievement Award, University of Florida
- 2006, Founder's Laurel, Congress of Neurological Surgeons
- 2009, Golden Neuron Award, World Academy of Neurological Surgery

== Personal life ==
He and his wife Joyce had four children, all involved in the field of medicine. His daughter is also a professor in the field of medicine.

Rhoton lived his later years in Gainesville, Florida, and died in Gainesville on February 21, 2016, at the age of 83.

== Books ==
- Cranial Anatomy and Surgical Approaches (2003), written by Albert Rhoton Jr.
