= Regli =

Regli is a surname. Notable people with the surname include:

- Laura Gore (1918–1957; born Laura Emilia Regli), Italian actress
- Francesco Regli (1802–1866), Italian writer
- Luca Regli (born 1962), Swiss neurosurgeon

== See also ==
- Reggi
