= Viviane Tabar =

American neurosurgeon

- Occupation: Neurosurgeon
- Spouse: Lorenz Studer

Academic background
- Education: American University of Beirut

Academic work
- Discipline: Stem cell biology
- Institutions: Memorial Sloan Kettering Cancer Center
- Main interests: Intraoperative brain mapping

Viviane Tabar is an American neurosurgeon, the Chair of the Department of Neurosurgery at Memorial Sloan Kettering Cancer Center in New York since 2017.

== Biography ==
Tabar took her medical degree from the American University of Beirut. It was followed by a neurosurgical residency at the University of Massachusetts. She did postdoctoral work at the National Institute of Neurological Disorders and Stroke.

Having done a research fellowship at Memorial Sloan Kettering Cancer Center, Tabar joined the faculty. At present, she is the Theresa C. Feng Chair for Neurosurgical Oncology and the Vice Chair for Neurosurgical Research and Education. In December 2017, she was named Chair of the Department of Neurosurgery at Memorial Sloan Kettering Cancer Center, succeeding to Philip Gutin, MD.

Viviane Tabar is also the founding Director of the Multidisciplinary Pituitary and Skull Base Tumor Center at Memorial Sloan Kettering Cancer Center.

== Work ==
Tabar's specialty is intraoperative brain mapping techniques.

Her research is in stem cell biology, and she is one of the leaders of the New York State consortium for the development of human embryonic stem cell–derived dopamine neurons for Parkinson's disease. She has devised strategies for cell-based therapies for the repair of radiation-induced brain injury. Her lab has used pluripotent stem cells for brain tumor modeling, resulting in novel insights into the biology of gliomas and to the discovery of candidate therapeutic targets for brain tumors. She has a clinical expertise in the surgical management of brain tumors such as complex gliomas, meningiomas and skull base tumors. In 2010, with her research team of the Sloan-Kettering Cancer Center, she demonstrated the fact that tumorous blood vessel cells may come from tumor cells as a way to create their own blood supply. Those results contributed to demonstrate the great plasticity of tumors.

A prolific author, she has written dozens of widely cited publications.

== Other roles ==
- Since 2017: Member of the National Academy of Medicine
- Since 2014: Member of the American Society for Clinical Investigation
- Member of the Society of Neurological Surgeons
- Member of the American Association of Neurological Surgery
- Member of the American Brain Tumor Association
- Friend of the Murray F. Brennan, MD, FACS, International Guest Scholarship Fund

== Awards ==
- 2014: Top Doctors: New York Magazine
- 2013: Top Doctors: New York Metro Area
- 2012: Top Doctors: New York Metro Area
- 2011: Top Doctors: New York Metro Area

== Publications ==
- Tabar, Viviane; Shim, Jae-Won; Piao, Jinghua; Ganat, Yosif M.; Wakeman, Dustin R.; Xie, Zhong; Carrillo-Reid, Luis; Auyeung, Gordon; Antonacci, Chris; Buch, Amanda; Yang, Lichuan; Beal, M. Flint; Surmeier, D. James; Kordower, Jeffrey H.; Kriks, Sonja; Studer, Lorenz (6 Nov 2011). "Dopamine neurons derived from human ES cells efficiently engraft in animal models of Parkinson's disease". Nature. 480 (7378): 547–551. Bibcode:2011Natur.480..547K. doi:10.1038/nature10648. ISSN 1476-4687. PMC 3245796. PMID 22056989.
- Tabar, Viviane; Chadalavada, Kalyani; Wilshire, Jennifer; Kowalik, Urszula; Hovinga, Koos E.; Geber, Adam; Fligelman, Boris; Leversha, Margaret; Brennan, Cameron; Wang, Rong (21 Nov 2010). "Glioblastoma stem-like cells give rise to tumour endothelium". Nature. 468 (7325): 829–833. Bibcode:2010Natur.468..829W. doi:10.1038/nature09624. ISSN 1476-4687. PMID 21102433. S2CID 6151632.
- Perrier, A. L.; Tabar, V.; Barberi, T.; Rubio, M. E.; Bruses, J.; Topf, N.; Harrison, N. L.; Studer, L. (13 Aug 2004). "Derivation of midbrain dopamine neurons from human embryonic stem cells". Proceedings of the National Academy of Sciences. 101 (34): 12543–12548. doi:10.1073/pnas.0404700101. ISSN 0027-8424. PMC 515094. PMID 15310843.
- Lee, Gabsang; Papapetrou, Eirini P.; Kim, Hyesoo; Chambers, Stuart M.; Tomishima, Mark J.; Fasano, Christopher A.; Ganat, Yosif M.; Menon, Jayanthi; Shimizu, Fumiko; Viale, Agnes; Tabar, Viviane; Sadelain, Michel; Studer, Lorenz (19 Aug 2009). "Modelling pathogenesis and treatment of familial dysautonomia using patient-specific iPSCs". Nature. 461 (7262): 402–406. Bibcode:2009Natur.461..402L. doi:10.1038/nature08320. ISSN 1476-4687. PMC 2784695. PMID 19693009.
- Wakayama, T. (27 Apr 2001). "Differentiation of Embryonic Stem Cell Lines Generated from Adult Somatic Cells by Nuclear Transfer". Science. 292 (5517). American Association for the Advancement of Science (AAAS): 740–743. Bibcode:2001Sci...292..740W. doi:10.1126/science.1059399. ISSN 0036-8075. PMID 11326103. S2CID 39638175.

== Personal life ==
Viviane Tabar is married to Lorenz Studer. They have two children together. They both work at the Sloan Kettering Institute heading medical research projects.
