= Jan-Karl Burkhardt =

German-born neurosurgeon and academic

- Born: 1981 (age 44–45); Freiburg im Breisgau, Germany
- Education: Leipzig University (MD, 2007); University of Zurich (Habilitation, 2016); University of Tennessee (MBA, 2024)
- Scientific career
- Fields: Neurosurgery (cerebrovascular and endovascular)
- Workplaces: University of Pennsylvania; Baylor College of Medicine (2018–2020); University Hospital Zurich (2014–2016)
- Academic advisors: Michael T. Lawton

Jan-Karl Burkhardt (born 1981) is a German-born neurosurgeon and academic at the University of Pennsylvania. He is the James and Agnes Kim Associate Professor of Neurosurgery and division head of cerebrovascular surgery at the Hospital of the University of Pennsylvania. His clinical and research work focuses on cerebrovascular disorders, including cerebral cavernous malformations, intracranial aneurysms, arteriovenous malformations, moyamoya disease, and cerebral revascularization.

== Education and training ==
Burkhardt was born in Freiburg im Breisgau, Germany, in 1981. He received his medical degree from Leipzig University in 2007 and completed his neurosurgical residency at University Hospital Zurich from 2008 to 2014. During residency, he undertook an enfolded research fellowship at Weill Cornell Medicine in New York from 2010 to 2011 and an enfolded spine fellowship at Schulthess Klinik in Zurich from 2012 to 2013.

He completed his habilitation at the University of Zurich in 2016. He subsequently completed a fellowship in microsurgical cerebrovascular surgery under Michael T. Lawton at the University of California, San Francisco from 2016 to 2017 and in endovascular neuroradiology and neurosurgery at NYU Langone Health from 2017 to 2018. In 2024, he received a Physician Executive MBA from the University of Tennessee.

== Career and research ==
Before joining the University of Pennsylvania, Burkhardt held faculty positions at University Hospital Zurich and at Baylor College of Medicine. At Baylor, he served as chief of the neurovascular service at Baylor St. Luke's Medical Center and co-directed a microneurosurgery laboratory.

Burkhardt directs the Neurovascular Tissue Bank and Translational Laboratory and the Cerebral Revascularization Program at University of Pennsylvania. There he co-directs the Neurointerventional Fellowship Program and is the neurosurgical director of the Comprehensive Stroke Center.

His clinical practice includes both open microsurgical and endovascular treatment of cerebrovascular disease. A major area of his research has been cerebral cavernous malformation (CCM). In 2021, the Alliance to Cure Cavernous Malformation recognized Penn Medicine as its first CCM Center of Excellence, with Burkhardt serving as the center's medical director. His laboratory has collaborated with researchers in vascular biology on experimental nonsurgical treatments for CCM. A 2023 study in Stroke, which Burkhardt coauthored, reported that the mTORC1 inhibitor rapamycin inhibited the growth of cerebral cavernous malformations in adult mouse models. Burkhardt was the principal investigator of SYCAMORE, a randomized, double-blind, placebo-controlled Phase II trial of REC-994 in symptomatic cerebral cavernous malformation and the first Phase II trial completed in the disease. Twelve-month results were presented at the 2025 International Stroke Conference.

His CCM research program was featured in the 2022 documentary Eloquent, which followed patients with cavernous malformations. CBS Philadelphia reported on the documentary and on experimental treatment research being conducted by Burkhardt and other University of Pennsylvania investigators.

His other research has addressed intracranial aneurysms, arteriovenous malformations, cerebral revascularization, and middle meningeal artery embolization. In 2025, a multicenter study senior authored by Burkhardt comparing embolic materials for middle meningeal artery embolization in chronic subdural hematoma received the Cerebrovascular Paper of the Year award from Neurosurgery Publications and the Congress of Neurological Surgeons.

== Professional service ==
Burkhardt serves on the Stroke Communications Committee of the American Heart Association Stroke Council and as a liaison to the joint American Association of Neurological Surgeons and Congress of Neurological Surgeons Neurosurgery Quality Council. He has participated in the Standards and Guidelines Committee of the Society of NeuroInterventional Surgery, including as an author of the society's 2024 focused guidance on endovascular treatment of basilar artery occlusion. He is a member of the editorial board of Stroke: Vascular and Interventional Neurology.
