= Aleksandr Konovalov =

Alexander Konovalov may refer to:

- Aleksandr Konovalov (politician) (1875–1948), Russian Kadet politician and entrepreneur
- Aleksandr Konovalov (judge) (born 1968), Russian lawyer and politician
- Alexander N. Konovalov, Russian neuroscientist
