= John Campo =

John Campo may refer to:

- John P. Campo (1938–2005), American thoroughbred racehorse trainer
- John V. Campo, American psychiatrist
