= Karin Muraszko =

American neurosurgeon

- Born: Karin Marie Muraszko; June 19, 1955 (age 70); Jersey City, New Jersey
- Citizenship: American
- Education: Yale University
- Occupation: Neurosurgeon
- Spouse: Scott Van Sweringen
- Children: 2
- Medical career
- Institutions: University of Michigan

Karin Marie Muraszko is an American pediatric neurosurgeon.

As of 2012, she was the Julian T. Hoff Professor and chair of the department of neurosurgery at the University of Michigan.

She is the first woman to head a neurosurgery department at any medical school in the US. She specializes in brain and spinal cord abnormalities. She was a 2020 electee to the National Academy of Medicine in pediatric neurosurgery.

== Early life and education ==
She was born June 19, 1955 in Jersey City, New Jersey and learned to read at age five. She has a spinal cord abnormality, spina bifida, and underwent treatment as a child at Babies Hospital in New York, the same hospital where she would later also spend her residency.

She graduated with a B.S. at Yale University in 1977 with a major in history and biology. Muraszko obtained her medical degree from Columbia University College of Physicians and Surgeons in 1981. She initially intended to specialize in psychiatry but switched to neurological surgery in her third year. She was the first neurosurgery resident with a physical disability at Columbia Presbyterian Medical Center where the chairman of the neurological surgery department described her as "...the most outstanding person I've met in medicine" and further "...her intelligence, tenacity and motivation have enabled her to make a remarkable contribution to the care of our patients". She was the first woman admitted, in 1981, into the neurosurgery residency at Columbia's New York Neurological Institute. She completed her residency in 1988.

== Career ==
From 1988 to 1990 Muraszko worked as a Senior Staff Fellow at the National Institutes of Health-NINDS. She moved to the University of Michigan in 1990 where she headed the pediatric neurosurgery service from 1995. She became a professor in 2003. During her time teaching, among her neurosurgical students was Sanjay Gupta. In 2005 she became chair of the Department of Neurosurgery, in the process becoming the first woman to chair a neurosurgery department in the United States.

She is the medical director of "Project Shunt", the neurosurgery component of an annual medical mission by the Michigan, Ohio, chapter of the medical charity "Healing the Children" to Guatemala, which has one of the highest incidences of spina bifida in the world. She began leading the mission at the University of Michigan in 1998, leading a team of surgeons, residents and nurses in Guatemala City.

== Research ==
Muraszko is a specialist in pediatric neurosurgery. Her main interests are treating brain tumors, Chiari malformations, congenital spinal and brain abnormalities and complex craniofacial anomalies.

== Society positions ==
Muraszko is the first woman to serve as director of the American Board of Neurological Surgery, and still was the only one as of 2010.

Muraszko serves on the Physician's Advisory Committee of the Spina Bifida Association of America and the March of Dimes.

Muraszko was elected as the first woman to be president of the Society of Neurological Surgeons during the SNS Centennial celebration year. She is a founding member of Women in Neurosurgery. She was a 2020 electee to the National Academy of Medicine in pediatric neurosurgery.

== Awards and honors ==
- In 2005 the Association of Women Surgeons awarded her the Nina Starr Braunwald Award "in recognition of outstanding contributions to the advancement of women in surgery".
- In 2014 Muraszko received the Inspirational Physician Award from the American Medical Association's Women Physicians Section.
- Muraszko received the Congress of Neurological Surgeons Distinguished Service Award in 2015.
- Awarded the American Association of Neurological Surgeons Humanitarian Award in 2016.

== Personal life ==
She is married to Scott Van Sweringen, an architect; they have twin children. She lives in Ann Arbor, Michigan.

== Selected articles ==
- Wilkinson, D. Andrew; Johnson, Kyle; Garton, Hugh J. L.; Muraszko, Karin M.; Maher, Cormac O. (February 2017). "Trends in surgical treatment of Chiari malformation Type I in the United States". Journal of Neurosurgery: Pediatrics. 19 (2): 208–216. doi:10.3171/2016.8.PEDS16273. PMID 27834622.
- Lee, Do Kyeong; Muraszko, Karin; Ulrich, Beverly D. (2016). "Bone Mineral Content in Infants With Myelomeningocele, With and Without Treadmill Stepping Practice". Pediatric Physical Therapy. 28 (1): 24–32. doi:10.1097/PEP.0000000000000217. PMID 27088680. S2CID 25293819.
- Kung, Theodore A.; Vercler, Christian J.; Muraszko, Karin M.; Buchman, Steven R. (March 2016). "Endoscopic Strip Craniectomy for Craniosynostosis". Journal of Craniofacial Surgery. 27 (2): 293–298. doi:10.1097/SCS.0000000000002364. PMID 26886293. S2CID 19654793.
- Oldfield, Edward H.; Muraszko, Karin; Shawker, Thomas H.; Patronas, Nicholas J. (January 1994). "Pathophysiology of syringomyelia associated with Chiari I malformation of the cerebellar tonsils". Journal of Neurosurgery. 80 (1): 3–15. doi:10.3171/jns.1994.80.1.0003. PMID 8271018.
- Yew, Andrew Y.; Maher, Cormac O.; Muraszko, Karin M.; Garton, Hugh J.L. (2011). "Long-Term Health Status in Benign External Hydrocephalus". Pediatric Neurosurgery. 47 (1): 1–6. doi:10.1159/000322357. PMID 21778677. S2CID 22431060.
- Lien, Samuel C.; Maher, Cormac O.; Garton, Hugh J. L.; Kasten, Steven J.; Muraszko, Karin M.; Buchman, Steven R. (2 March 2010). "Local and regional flap closure in myelomeningocele repair: a 15-year review". Child's Nervous System. 26 (8): 1091–1095. doi:10.1007/s00381-010-1099-9. PMID 20195618. S2CID 6038548.
- Cools, Michael J.; Al-Holou, Wajd N.; Stetler, William R.; Wilson, Thomas J.; Muraszko, Karin M.; Ibrahim, Mohannad; La Marca, Frank; Garton, Hugh J. L.; Maher, Cormac O. (May 2014). "Filum terminale lipomas: imaging prevalence, natural history, and conus position". Journal of Neurosurgery: Pediatrics. 13 (5): 559–567. doi:10.3171/2014.2.PEDS13528. PMID 24628511.
- Proctor, Mark R.; Scott, R. Michael; Oakes, W. Jerry; Muraszko, Karin M. (September 2011). "Chiari malformation". Neurosurgical Focus. 31 (3): Introduction. doi:10.3171/2011.8.FOCUS11195. PMID 21882911.
- Al-Holou, Wajd N.; Yew, Andrew Y.; Boomsaad, Zackary E.; Garton, Hugh J. L.; Muraszko, Karin M.; Maher, Cormac O. (June 2010). "Prevalence and natural history of arachnoid cysts in children". Journal of Neurosurgery: Pediatrics. 5 (6): 578–585. doi:10.3171/2010.2.PEDS09464. PMID 20515330.
- Muraszko, KM; Garton, H; Song, DK (2008). "Training in pediatric neurosurgery". Journal of Pediatric Rehabilitation Medicine. 1 (1): 47–9. PMID 21791740.
- Warschausky, S; Angobaldo, J; Kewman, D; Buchman, S; Muraszko, KM; Azengart, A (May 2005). "Early development of infants with untreated metopic craniosynostosis". Plastic and Reconstructive Surgery. 115 (6): 1518–23. doi:10.1097/01.prs.0000160270.27558.64. PMID 15861054. S2CID 23043522.
- Kahn, Elyne N.; Muraszko, Karin M.; Maher, Cormac O. (October 2015). "Prevalence of Chiari I Malformation and Syringomyelia". Neurosurgery Clinics of North America. 26 (4): 501–507. doi:10.1016/j.nec.2015.06.006. PMID 26408058.
- Hollon, Todd C.; Lewis, Spencer; Pandian, Balaji; Niknafs, Yashar S.; Garrard, Mia R.; Garton, Hugh; Maher, Cormac O.; McFadden, Kathryn; Snuderl, Matija; Lieberman, Andrew P.; Muraszko, Karin; Camelo-Piragua, Sandra; Orringer, Daniel A. (1 January 2018). "Rapid Intraoperative Diagnosis of Pediatric Brain Tumors Using Stimulated Raman Histology". Cancer Research. 78 (1): 278–289. doi:10.1158/0008-5472.CAN-17-1974. PMC 5844703. PMID 29093006.
