= Steven Kalkanis =

American neurosurgeon

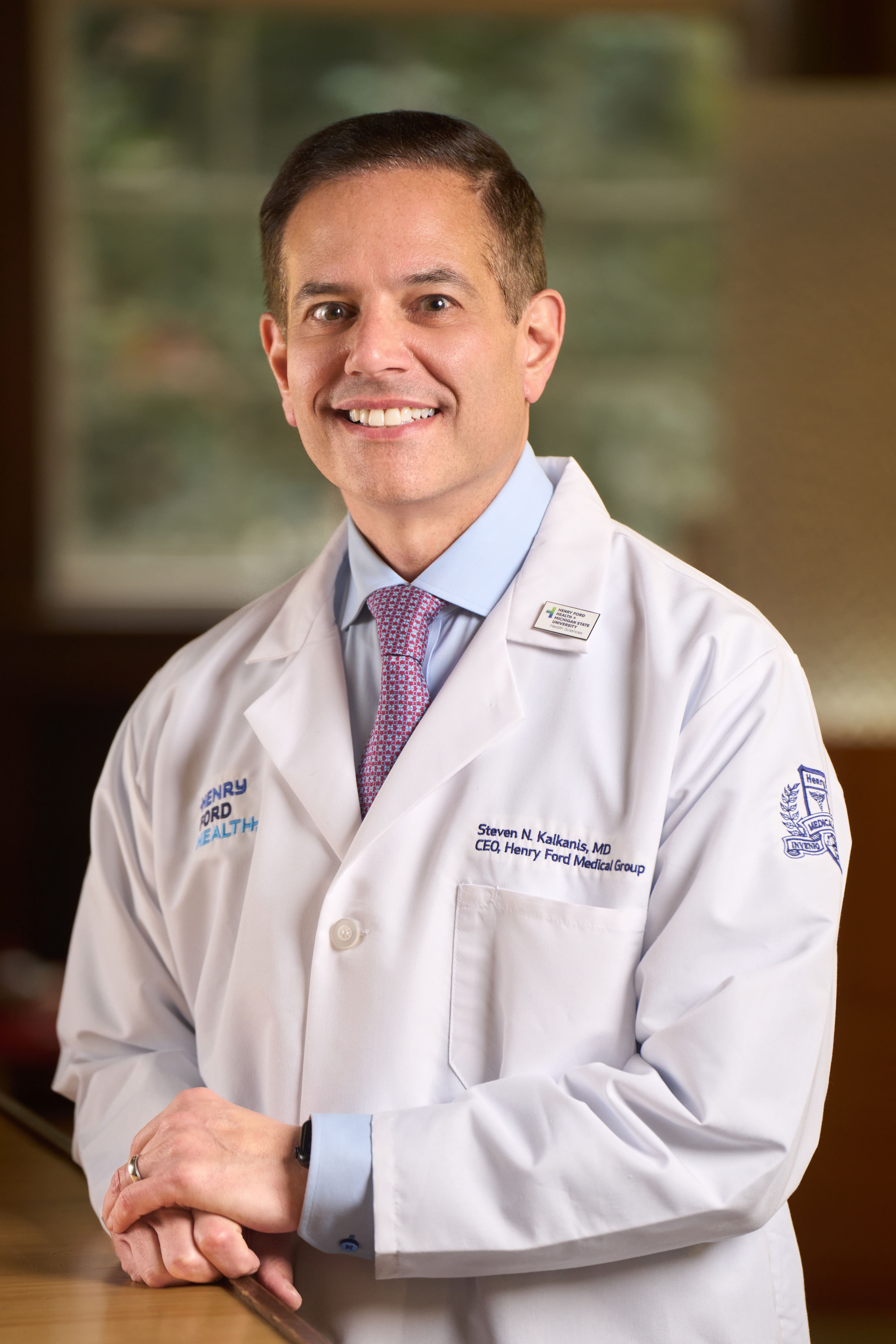
- Citizenship: American
- Education: Harvard College (BA); Harvard Medical School (MD)
- Occupations: Neurosurgeon; health system executive; academic administrator
- Employer: Henry Ford Health
- Known for: Neuro-oncology; precision medicine; leadership at Henry Ford Health
- Notable work: The Treatment of Adults with Metastatic Brain Tumors (CNS/AANS guideline)
- Title: Executive Vice President and Chief Academic Officer, Henry Ford Health; CEO, Henry Ford Medical Group; CEO, Henry Ford Hospital

Steven N. Kalkanis is an American neurosurgeon, academic researcher, and healthcare executive. He serves as executive vice president of Henry Ford Health, chief executive officer of Henry Ford Hospital, and CEO of Henry Ford Medical Group. He has served as the past president of the Congress of Neurological Surgeons and as a director of the American Board of Neurological Surgery. He also serves as a board member for America's Essential Hospitals, Henry Ford Health, and the American Medical Group Association, and he chairs the board of trustees at Detroit Country Day School.

== Early life and education ==
Kalkanis was born in Michigan. He attended Harvard University, where he earned his undergraduate degree (B.A.) with highest honors in Government and International Relations in addition to a dual focus on premedical studies. He then earned his medical degree (M.D.) from Harvard Medical School, where he was awarded the Linnane Prize for highest academic achievement and served as Class Marshal. He completed his neurosurgery residency at Massachusetts General Hospital, a Harvard teaching hospital.

== Career ==
Following his neurosurgical training, Kalkanis joined Henry Ford Health in Detroit, Michigan, as a faculty neurosurgeon and academic researcher. He progressed through the department of neurosurgery to become Chair of Neurosurgery and co-director of the Neuroscience Institute at Henry Ford in 2014. During this period he held endowed chairs, including the Mark R. Rosenblum Endowed Chair in Neurosurgery and the Vlasic Endowed Chair.

In January 2020, Kalkanis was appointed Executive Vice President and Chief Academic Officer of Henry Ford Health and CEO of the Henry Ford Medical Group, overseeing its physician, researcher, and trainee workforce. In 2023, he additionally became CEO of Henry Ford Hospital.

Kalkanis was involved in the establishment of the Brigitte Harris Cancer Pavilion and in developing the system's precision-medicine and molecular tumor board programs. He also participated in national cancer-policy discussions through the White House Cancer Moonshot and the Biden Cancer Initiative in 2016 and 2018.

He served as the inaugural President and Dean of the Henry Ford–Michigan State University Health Sciences partnership, which coordinated academic, clinical, and research activities between the two institutions.

== Research and scholarship ==
Kalkanis’ research spans molecular neuro-oncology, translational therapeutics, and evidence-based neurosurgical practice. At the Cell-based Translational Therapeutics Laboratory at the Hermelin Brain Tumor Center at Henry Ford Health, he has led work on malignant brain tumors, including glioblastomas and metastatic lesions.

His research incorporates molecular genetics, stem-cell biology, and precision medicine to study individualized treatment approaches. Early work conducted at Harvard showed that vascular endothelial growth factor (VEGF) correlates with vasogenic cerebral edema in meningiomas. Subsequent studies involved genomic and microRNA profiling of gliomas to identify molecular features associated with patient outcomes.

A focus of his laboratory has been cell-based and targeted therapy delivery. His group investigated the use of human umbilical cord blood progenitor cells as carriers for therapeutic agents directed at glioma cells, exploring strategies to bypass the blood–brain barrier. His team has also developed animal and AI-generated patient-specific “avatar” models of glioma and brain metastasis xenografts for pre-clinical therapeutic testing.

Kalkanis has contributed to evidence-based neurosurgery, including serving as senior author and chair of the national task force that produced the Congress of Neurological Surgeons (CNS) and American Association of Neurological Surgeons (AANS) guideline, The Treatment of Adults with Metastatic Brain Tumors, which outlines evidence-based recommendations for managing brain metastases.

He has also worked on integrating precision medicine into clinical practice. At Henry Ford Health, he helped establish a molecular tumor-board program in which multidisciplinary teams review sequencing data to guide treatment decisions.

His research has been supported by the National Institutes of Health, the National Cancer Institute, the American Brain Tumor Association, and the Henry Ford Research Fund. He has served as co-principal investigator on NIH U01 CA137443-01, focused on cell-based anti-glioma therapies, and on studies involving intra-operative Raman spectroscopy, remote intracranial pressure monitoring, and focused-ultrasound ablation.

Kalkanis has authored more than 250 peer-reviewed articles and 20 book chapters, with over 30,000 citations and an H-index of 74 as of 2025. His work has appeared in journals such as the Journal of Neurosurgery, Neuro-Oncology, Cancer Research, JAMA, and the New England Journal of Medicine. He has delivered invited lectures and visiting professorships at numerous universities and scientific meetings.

== Awards and honors ==
- Mark Rosenblum Lifetime Achievement Award in Neurosurgery, jointly presented by the AANS and CNS Section on Tumors.
- President of the Congress of Neurological Surgeons (2019–2020).
- Director of the American Board of Neurological Surgery.
- Holder of the Mark R. Rosenblum Endowed Chair in Neurosurgery and the Vlasic Family Endowed Chair in Neurosurgery at Henry Ford Health.
- Named among Michigan's Top Doctors annually by Hour Detroit magazine since 2008.
- Young Investigator Award from the American Brain Tumor Association and the Brain Tumor Society Research Grant.
- Included in Best Doctors in America and Castle Connolly Top Doctors listings.
- Henry Ford Innovation Award for leadership in precision-medicine infrastructure.
- Fellow of the American College of Surgeons and member of the Society of Neurological Surgeons.
- ACCLAIM Award (on behalf of Henry Ford Medical Group) from the American Medical Group Association.
- Joy in Medicine Award (on behalf of Henry Ford Medical Group) from the American Medical Association.
- Selected as an Archon of the Greek Orthodox Church by Ecumenical Patriarch Bartholomew of Constantinople.

== Selected publications ==
- Kalkanis, S. N.; Carroll, R. S.; Zhang, J.; Zamani, A. A.; Black, P. M. (1996). "Vascular endothelial growth factor (VEGF) expression correlates with peritumoral vasogenic cerebral edema in meningiomas." Journal of Neurosurgery 85 (6): 1095–1101.
- Kalkanis, S. N.; Quinones-Hinojosa, A.; Black, P. M. (2000). "Quality of life following surgery for intracranial meningiomas: a study of 164 patients using a modification of the Functional Assessment of Cancer Therapy-Brain questionnaire." Journal of Neuro-Oncology 48 (3): 233–241.
- Kalkanis, S. N.; Kondziolka, D.; Gaspar, L. E.; et al. (2009). "The treatment of adults with metastatic brain tumors: a systematic review and evidence-based clinical practice guideline." Journal of Neuro-Oncology 96 (Suppl 1): 7–10.
- Kalkanis, S. N.; Linskey, M. E.; Mehta, M.; et al. (2010). "Evidence-based clinical practice parameter guidelines for the treatment of patients with metastatic brain tumors: introduction." Journal of Neuro-Oncology 96 (1): 7–10.
- Kalkanis, S. N.; Golub, D.; Burks, J. D.; et al. (2012). "Stem-cell mediated delivery of therapeutic agents in malignant glioma models: translational potential and challenges." Neuro-Oncology 14 (4): 389–400.
