= Nelson M. Oyesiku =

Nigerian-born professor of neurosurgery

Professor, Dr. Nelson M. Oyesiku
- Born: Lagos, Nigeria
- Education: University of Ibadan; University of London; Emory University
- Occupations: Chair of Neurological Surgery at the University of North Carolina, professor, editor
- Years active: 1993-present
- Known for: Pituitary medicine and surgery
- Medical career
- Profession: Neurosurgeon, neuroscientist
- Institutions: University of North Carolina
- Sub-specialties: 3D endoscopy in pituitary surgery

Nelson M. Oyesiku is a Nigerian-American professor of neurosurgery and endocrinology. With a specialty in pituitary medicine and surgery, currently, he is the chair of the department of Neurological Surgery and Professor of Medicine (Endocrinology) at the University of North Carolina in Chapel Hill. he has been editor-in-chief of Neurosurgery, Operative Neurosurgery, and Neurosurgery Open. He was previously chair of the American Board of Neurological Surgery, among other organizations.

== Early life and education ==
Nelson Mobalanle Oyesiku was born in Lagos, Nigeria and is a native to Abeokuta. He is the second child of Nelson and Margaret Oyesiku, and has an older sister. He grew up in Apapa, and attended Corona School. With an early interest in neuroscience, he graduated from St. Gregory's College and received his medical degree from the University of Ibadan.

As a Commonwealth Scholar, he then attended the University of London in the United Kingdom, where he later obtained an MSc in Occupational Medicine as well. Then emigrating to the United States, he did his surgery internship at the University of Connecticut Hartford Hospital.

He did his neurosurgical residency training and completed a Ph.D. in the neuroscience graduate program at Emory University in Atlanta, Georgia. During his residency training, he completed a PhD in Neuroscience as well.

== Career ==
=== Prior roles ===
He was appointed to the neurosurgical faculty in 1993 at Emory upon completion of his training. At Emory, he focused his research and laboratory on the molecular pathogenesis of pituitary adenomas.

At Emory University School of Medicine, he went on to serve as the director of the Inaugural Daniel Louis Barrow Chair in Neurosurgery, as Vice-Chairman of the Department of Neurological Surgery, as Director of the Neurosurgical Residency Program, and as the Director of Laboratory and Molecular Neurosurgery and Biotechnology.

He became chair of the American Board of Neurological Surgery in August 2012.

In 2019, he was both the residency program director for Emory’s Department of Neurosurgery and editor-in-chief of the medical journal Neurosurgery.

=== Current roles ===
Oyesiku's current research includes the investigation of the development of pituitary adenomas using genome-wide association studies and whole genome sequencing methods.

He is the principal investigator of the R25 NIH training grant for neurosurgery.

Currently, he is the chair of the department of Neurological Surgery and Professor of Medicine (Endocrinology) at the University of North Carolina in Chapel Hill.

== Research and practices ==
His clinical focus is on the surgical treatment of and molecular biology of pituitary tumors. As a board-certified neurosurgeon, Oyesiku has performed over 2,000 pituitary tumor surgeries.

=== Gene expression studies ===
In 2001, Oyesiku and his team of researchers were responsible for performing the first studies on high throughput gene expression studies that identified unique aspects of pituitary adenoma gene expression which led to a new imaging procedure and potential targeted therapy of pituitary tumors. This molecular imaging diagnostic tool was pioneered and first utilized at Emory for patients with pituitary tumors, this imaging allows doctors to identify a key tumor marker in patients with clinically nonfunctional pituitary tumors, identifying patients for a potential new, targeted chemotherapy for clinically nonfunctional pituitary tumors.

=== Pituitary adenomas ===
His laboratory contains one of the largest pituitary tumor banks connected to a clinical database to study natural history, treatment outcomes, and molecular correlations.

=== 3D endoscopy use ===
He was one of the first to use 3D endoscopy in pituitary surgery, and one of few surgeons in the US and worldwide (and the first in Georgia) to utilize advanced 3-D endoscopic surgery for the resection of pituitary tumors.

In 2009, Oyesiku was one of the first to use the Visionsense 3D stereoscopic vision system at The Emory Pituitary Center at Emory University Hospital, and five years later Emory became the first medical center in the country to use the same company's 3D HD stereoscopic system, utilizing its stereoscopic and endoscopic views.

== Publications and editing ==
Oyesiku has authored manuscripts, book chapters, and a book in the field of neurosurgery. He has over 180 publications in various academic journals and has served as an adhoc reviewer for several.

In 2009 was named editor-in-chief of Neurosurgery, the official journal of the Congress of Neurological Surgeons. He served in the role from June 2009 until September 2021.

== Society activities ==
Oyesiku has served on the board of directors of the American Board of Neurological Surgery, as chairman of the Maintenance of Certification Committee, as chairman of the American Board of Neurological Surgery, on the Board of Governors of the American College of Surgeons, and on the Advisory Council for Neurosurgery of the American College of Surgeons.

He is also a member of the Residency Review Committee of Neurosurgery of the ACGME and was a Fellow of the American College of Surgeons.

He has held leadership positions in the following organizations: the Congress of Neurological Surgeons, the Federation for International Education in Neurosurgery, the Georgia Neurosurgical Society, the Society of Neurological Surgeons, and the World Federation of Neurosurgical Societies.

== Awards and titles ==
Oyesiku was decorated as Baa Segun-Alabe (Surgeon-in-Chief) of Egbaland by the paramount ruler of Egbaland in Abeokuta, the capital city of Nigeria's southwestern Ogun State, to honor his efforts as a good ambassador of the community.

He also received the following awards and honors:

- 1992 - Resident Award, American Academy of neurosurgery
- 1994 - Young Investigator Award
- 1994 - Brain Trauma Award
- 1995-1999 - Medical Faculty Development Award, Robert Wood Johnson Foundation
- 1992 - Augustus McCravey Resident Award, Southern Neurological Society
- 2001-2008 - Best Doctors in America, Peer Selected
- 2002 - 2004 - America's Top Surgeons, Consumer Research Council
- 2014 - Gentle Giant Award, Pituitary Network Association
- 2021 - The Congress of Neurological Surgeons (CNS) prestigious Distinguished Service Award

== Personal life ==
He and his wife Lola on November 17, 2019 were decorated as Surgeon-in-Chief and Queen Consort of the Surgeon-in-Chief of Egbaland. He and Omolola, a nurse and midwife, have three children.
