= Luca Regli =

Swiss neurosurgeon and medical researcher

- Born: April 26, 1962 (age 64)
- Occupation: Neurosurgeon
- Parent: Franco Regli (father)

Luca Paolo Eugenio Regli (born 1962) is a neurosurgeon and full professor and chairman of the Department of Neurosurgery of the University Hospital of Zürich since October 2012. He is the son of Franco Regli, a Swiss professor of neurology and founder of the Foundation Franco Regli for the Research in the Field of Neurodegenerative Diseases.

== Career ==
Regli studied medicine at the University of Lausanne and worked at the (Lausanne University Hospital) where he trained under Nicolas de Tribolet. In 1991, Regli continued his specialization at the Mayo Clinic (Rochester, Minnesota, USA), forming his expertise in the microsurgical treatment of complex intracranial lesions. He obtained his board certification in neurosurgery and worked alongside David G. Piepgras.

In 1993, Regli visited Phoenix to learn from Robert F. Spetzler. In early 1994, he returned to Lausanne until 2008 where he was gradually promoted to professor and chairman. In 2008, Regli was called as full professor and chairman of neurosurgery at the University Medical Center Utrecht (The Netherlands). He worked with Elana, which develops and manufactures medical devices for brain bypass surgery and is now part of Brain Technology Institute, a non-profit organization located in the Netherlands focusing on research and technology development for combating neurosurgical diseases, of which he has been a board member since it was founded in 2013.

In 2012, the University of Zurich nominated him as professor and chair of the Department of Neurosurgery of the University Hospital of Zürich, which is an international reference center for cerebrovascular diseases, neuro-oncology, and functional neurosurgery.

Regli's research interests involve clinical questions in the domain of cerebral ischemia, cerebral metabolism, cerebral homeostasis, and edema, as well as surgical techniques for cerebral revascularization and intra-operative imaging.

== Published works ==
Regli has authored or co-authored over 250 peer-reviewed journal publications and 18 book chapters, including as editor of neurosurgical textbooks. Regli's Google Scholar profile shows that his work has been cited over 13,000 times, giving him an h-index of 48.

=== Selected articles and chapters ===
- Badaut, J.; Hirt, L.; Granziera, C.; Bogousslavsky, J.; Magistretti, P. J.; Regli, L. (May 2001). "Astrocyte-specific expression of aquaporin-9 in mouse brain is increased after transient focal cerebral ischemia". Journal of Cerebral Blood Flow and Metabolism. 21 (5): 477–482. doi:10.1097/00004647-200105000-00001. ISSN 0271-678X. PMID 11333357. S2CID 10158561.
- Regli, Luca; Uske, Antoine; Tribolet, Nicolas de (1999-06-01). "Endovascular coil placement compared with surgical clipping for the treatment of unruptured middle cerebral artery aneurysms: a consecutive series". Journal of Neurosurgery. 90 (6): 1025–1030. doi:10.3171/jns.1999.90.6.1025. PMID 10350247.
- Badaut, J.; Regli, L. (2004-01-01). "Distribution and possible roles of aquaporin 9 in the brain". Neuroscience. Brain Water Homeostasis. 129 (4): 969–979. doi:10.1016/j.neuroscience.2004.06.035. ISSN 0306-4522. PMID 15561412. S2CID 32568352.
- Badaut, J.; Petit, J. -M.; Brunet, J. -F.; Magistretti, P. J.; Charriaut-Marlangue, C.; Regli, L. (2004-01-01). "Distribution of Aquaporin 9 in the adult rat brain: Preferential expression in catecholaminergic neurons and in glial cells". Neuroscience. 128 (1): 27–38. doi:10.1016/j.neuroscience.2004.05.042. ISSN 0306-4522. PMID 15450351. S2CID 23383060.
- Stupp, Roger; Dietrich, Pierre-Yves; Kraljevic, Sandrine Ostermann; Pica, Alessia; Maillard, Ivan; Maeder, Phillipe; Meuli, Reto; Janzer, Robert; Pizzolato, Gianpaolo; Miralbell, Raymond; Porchet, François (2002-03-01). "Promising Survival for Patients With Newly Diagnosed Glioblastoma Multiforme Treated With Concomitant Radiation Plus Temozolomide Followed by Adjuvant Temozolomide". Journal of Clinical Oncology. 20 (5): 1375–1382. doi:10.1200/JCO.2002.20.5.1375. ISSN 0732-183X. PMID 11870182.
- Regli, Luca; Dehdashti, A. R.; Uske, A.; de Tribolet, N. (2002). "Endovascular Coiling Compared with Surgical Clipping for the Treatment of Unruptured Middle Cerebral Artery Aneurysms: An Update". In Yonekawa, Y.; Sakurai, Y.; Keller, E.; Tsukahara, T. (eds.). New Trends in Cerebral Aneurysm Management. Acta Neurochirurgica Supplements. Vol. 82. Vienna: Springer. pp. 41–46. doi:10.1007/978-3-7091-6736-6_8. ISBN 978-3-7091-6736-6. PMID 12378989.
- Broekman, Marike L. D.; Beijnum, Janneke van; Peul, Wilco C.; Regli, Luca (2011-10-01). "Neurosurgery and shaving: what's the evidence?: A review". Journal of Neurosurgery. 115 (4): 670–678. doi:10.3171/2011.5.JNS102003. ISSN 1933-0693. PMID 21721875.
- Carlsson, Gunnel E.; et al. (2003). "Karger Publishing". Cerebrovascular Diseases. 16 (4): 311–337. doi:10.1159/000072554. PMID 14584488. S2CID 5062245.
- Hegi, Monika E.; Diserens, Annie-Claire; Godard, Sophie; Dietrich, Pierre-Yves; Regli, Luca; Ostermann, Sandrine; Otten, Philippe; Melle, Guy Van; Tribolet, Nicolas de; Stupp, Roger (2004-03-15). "Clinical Trial Substantiates the Predictive Value of O-6-Methylguanine-DNA Methyltransferase Promoter Methylation in Glioblastoma Patients Treated with Temozolomide". Clinical Cancer Research. 10 (6): 1871–1874. doi:10.1158/1078-0432.CCR-03-0384. ISSN 1078-0432. PMID 15041700. S2CID 12027992.

=== Books ===
- "Trends in Neurovascular Interventions - Tetsuya Tsukahara, Giuseppe Esposito, Hans-Jakob Steiger - Englische E-Books | Ex Libris". Ex Libris AG.
- "Trends in Cerebrovascular Surgery". blackwells.co.uk.
- "Trends in Cerebrovascular Surgery and Interventions". blackwells.co.uk.
- "Machine Learning in Clinical Neuroscience". blackwells.co.uk.
