= John V. Campo =

American psychiatrist

- Awards: Klingenstein Third Generation Foundation Award (American Academy of Child and Adolescent Psychiatry, 2020)
- Scientific career
- Fields: Child and adolescent psychiatry
- Workplaces: Johns Hopkins University School of Medicine; Kennedy Krieger Institute; Ohio State University Wexner Medical Center; Nationwide Children's Hospital; Rockefeller Neuroscience Institute

John V. Campo is an American child and adolescent psychiatrist, who has held roles at Johns Hopkins University School of Medicine, Kennedy Krieger Institute, and Rockefeller Neuroscience Institute. His research specializes on suicide and depression.

== Career ==
From 2006, Campo held a dual role at Nationwide Children’s Hospital and Ohio State University. In May 2012, it was announced that Campo would be named Chair of Psychiatry in the Ohio State University College of Medicine. He served as leadership of the Department of Psychiatry, the clinical operations at the Ohio State Wexner Medical Center, and the professorship of clinical psychiatry and pediatrics.

His research appeared on WPSU, discussing the disparity between urban and rural suicide rates. The research showed that those aged 10-24 in rural areas had double the suicide rate of their peers in urban settings. The findings were also discussed in The Columbus Dispatch. Campo was part of the Tedx Talk in February 2015 at Ohio State University.

Another study revealed a rise in suicide rates among young women in the United States. Campo's work around this period also studied connections between social media and suicide in teens and young adults. He analyzed the impact of the TV series 13 Reasons Why on U.S. youth suicide rates, earning the Klingenstein Third Generation Foundation Award from the American Academy of Child and Adolescent Psychiatry in 2020.

In 2020, Campo was appointed to the faculty of the Johns Hopkins University School of Medicine. In January 2021, he concurrently became Vice President of Psychiatric Services at the Kennedy Krieger Institute, an independent pediatric medical and research institution affiliated with Johns Hopkins.

In 2024, Campo published research in The Journal of the American Medical Association suggesting that "60% of youths (ages 10–24) who died by suicide had no documented mental health diagnosis."" It argued that intervention through existing mental health pathways might not prevent suicides in certain age ranges. The research findings were covered by CNN.
