= Lorenz Studer =

Swiss neurobiologist

- Born: March 5, 1966 (age 60); Solothurn, Switzerland
- Education: University of Fribourg (1987); University of Bern (1991, 1994)
- Known for: Stem cell Parkinson's disease research
- Awards: MacArthur Fellowship (2015); Annemarie Opprecht Parkinson Award (2012); Louise and Allston Boyer Young Investigator in Basic Research, MSKCC (2005)
- Scientific career
- Fields: Developmental biology Stem cells Neuroscience; Parkinson's disease
- Workplaces: Memorial Sloan Kettering Cancer Center; Sloan Kettering Institute; Weill Cornell Medical College (Affiliated)

Lorenz Studer (born March 5, 1966) is a Swiss biologist. He is the founder and director of the Center for Stem Cell Biology at Memorial-Sloan Kettering Cancer Center in New York City. He is a developmental biologist and neuroscientist who is pioneering the generation of midbrain dopamine neurons for transplantation and clinical applications. His expertise in cell engineering spans a wide range of cells/tissues within the nervous system geared toward disease modeling and exploring cell replacement therapy. Currently, he is a member of the Developmental Biology Program and Department of Neurosurgery at Memorial Sloan-Kettering Cancer Center and a professor of Neuroscience at Weill Cornell Medical College in New York City, NY.

In 2015, he was named a recipient of the MacArthur Fellowship (also known as the "Genius Grant") for his innovative work on stem cell and Parkinson's disease research.

Implementation of Studer's cell replacement therapy clinical trial which utilizes dopamine neurons generated from human embryonic/pluripotent stem cells for Parkinson's disease would be the first of its kind. The clinical trial which already has begun recruiting patients, is expected to receive the FDA's study permission by the end of 2020, with an anticipated start date in 2021.

Most recently, Studer was awarded an $8.95 million grant from the Aligning Science Across Parkinson's (ASAP) Initiative, in partnership with the Michael J. Fox Foundation. Memorial Sloan Kettering Cancer Center, where Studer works, was designated as the lead grant recipient among the five that will be sharing the overall award.

== Research ==
In 1998, while at the lab of Ronald D. McKay at the National Institutes of Health in Bethesda, Maryland, he developed techniques that facilitate the generation of dopamine cells, the primary cell type affected in Parkinson's disease in vitro from dividing precursor cells. He successfully demonstrated that upon transplantation, these newly developed dopaminergic neurons can improve clinical symptoms in Parkinsonian rat models.

Over the years, he has developed a variety of novel cell engineering strategies for developing specific neural cell types in culture. Most notably, he has devised protocols for the transition (or "differentiation") of human pluripotent stem cells into neural and neural crest tissues and for the generation of functional dopaminergic neurons in large-scale quantities. In long-term studies, Studer demonstrated that these cells are non-tumorigenic, can integrate into the host brain and may serve as functional replacements for the substantia nigra dopamine neurons which die in Parkinson's disease.

Current research efforts also include directing the fate and age of human pluripotent stem cells, and using pluripotent stem cells as valuable tools for modeling human diseases such as Familial Dysautonomia, Hirschsprung's disease, neurodevelopmental disorders such as autism, melanocyte-related diseases, as well as mechanisms of aging. On aging research, he has also been among the first to manipulate cellular age in pluripotent-derived lineages.

Other major contributions include the directed differentiation of nuclear transfer embryonic stem cells and parthenogenetic stem cells into specific neuron types. His lab was also the first to demonstrate "therapeutic cloning" in a mouse model of a central nervous system disorder.

Overall, Studer's decades long investigation into neurological diseases such as Parkinson's disease and clinical applications of stem cells has helped advance the field of cell replacement therapy. He currently also leads a multidisciplinary consortium to pursue the application of human stem cell-derived dopamine neurons for the treatment of Parkinson's disease.

== Education and career ==
Studer, a native of Switzerland, graduated from medical school in 1991 and earned his neuroscience doctoral degree in 1994 at the University of Bern. There, he worked with Christian Spenger, culminating in the first clinical trial of fetal tissue transplantation for Parkinson's disease in Switzerland in 1995. The following year, he joined Ronald McKay's lab at the National Institute of Health (NIH) to investigate how neural cells could be isolated, cultured, and differentiated to produce neurons with the aim of restoring brain function in Parkinson's disease mouse models.

In 2000, Studer moved to New York City where he embarked on his own research program at Memorial-Sloan Kettering Cancer Center (MSKCC) with a focus on exploring stem cells and brain repair. He also established the Sloan-Kettering Center for Stem Cell Biology and has been involved in a number of stem cell research committees and initiatives including the Tri-Institutional Stem Cell Initiative, (a collaboration between Memorial-Sloan Kettering Cancer Center, Rockefeller University, and Weill-Cornell Medical College), Michael J. Fox Foundation for Parkinson's disease research, and the New York Stem Cell Foundation.

In 2016, Studer became a scientific cofounder of BlueRock Therapeutics, a biotech company to develop induced pluripotent stem cell (iPSC) therapies for degenerative conditions like Parkinson's disease and heart failure. Its launch was the product of a joint venture between Versant Ventures and Bayer AG, with a $225 million investment – one of the largest-ever series A financings for a biotech company. In 2019, BlueRock was acquired by Bayer AG, in a transaction valued at up to $1 billion.

== Awards and memberships ==
- Louise and Allston Boyer Young Investigator in Basic Research, MSKCC (2005)
- Annemarie Opprecht Award for Parkinson's Disease Research (2012)
- Member, American Society for Clinical Investigation (2014)
- MacArthur Fellows Program (2015)
- Ogawa-Yamanaka Stem Cell Prize, Gladstone Institute (2017)
- Gabbay Award (2018)
- Member of the National Academy of Medicine (2024)

== Selected publications ==
- Studer, Lorenz, and Viviane Tabar. "Parkinson’s disease grafts benefit from well-timed growth factor." Nature (2020).
- Cornacchia, Daniela, et al. "Lipid deprivation induces a stable, naive-to-primed intermediate state of pluripotency in human PSCs." Cell Stem Cell 25.1 (2019): 120–136.
- Cederquist, Gustav Y., et al. "Specification of positional identity in forebrain organoids." Nature Biotechnology 37.4 (2019): 436–444.
- Kishinevsky, Sarah, et al. "HSP90-incorporating chaperome networks as biosensor for disease-related pathways in patient-specific midbrain dopamine neurons." Nature Communications 9.1 (2018): 1–15.
- Fattahi, Faranak, et al. "Deriving human ENS lineages for cell therapy and drug discovery in Hirschsprung disease." Nature 531.7592 (2016): 105–109.
- Tabar, Viviane, and Lorenz Studer. "Pluripotent stem cells in regenerative medicine: challenges and recent progress." Nature Reviews Genetics 15.2 (2014): 82–92.
- Dincer, Zehra, Jinghua Piao, Lei Niu, Yosif Ganat, Sonja Kriks, Bastian Zimmer, Song-Hai Shi, Viviane Tabar, and Lorenz Studer."Specification of Functional Cranial Placode Derivatives from Human Pluripotent Stem Cells" Cell Reports Volume 5, Issue 5, p1387–1402, 12 December 2013.
- Kriks, Sonja, Jae-Won Shim, Jinghua Piao, Yosif M. Ganat, Dustin R. Wakeman, Zhong Xie, Luis Carrillo-Reid et al. "Dopamine neurons derived from human ES cells efficiently engraft in animal models of Parkinson/'s disease." Nature 480, no. 7378 (2011): 547–551.
- Chambers, Stuart M., Christopher A. Fasano, Eirini P. Papapetrou, Mark Tomishima, Michel Sadelain, and Lorenz Studer. "Highly efficient neural conversion of human ES and iPS cells by dual inhibition of SMAD signaling." Nature Biotechnology 27, no. 3 (2009): 275–280.
- Tabar, Viviane, Mark Tomishima, Georgia Panagiotakos, Sayaka Wakayama, Jayanthi Menon, Bill Chan, Eiji Mizutani et al. "Therapeutic cloning in individual parkinsonian mice." Nature Medicine 14, no. 4 (2008): 379–381.
- Lee, Gabsang, Hyesoo Kim, Yechiel Elkabetz, George Al Shamy, Georgia Panagiotakos, Tiziano Barberi, Viviane Tabar, and Lorenz Studer. "Isolation and directed differentiation of neural crest stem cells derived from human embryonic stem cells." Nature Biotechnology 25, no. 12 (2007).
- Wakayama, Teruhiko, Viviane Tabar, Ivan Rodriguez, Anthony CF Perry, Lorenz Studer, and Peter Mombaerts. "Differentiation of embryonic stem cell lines generated from adult somatic cells by nuclear transfer." Science 292, no. 5517 (2001): 740–743.
- Studer, L., V. Tabar, and R.D. McKay (1998) Transplantation of expanded mesencephalic precursors leads to recovery in Parkinsonian rats. Nature Neuroscience 1:290-295.
