= L. Dade Lunsford =

American neurosurgeon

L. Dade Lunsford (born July 25, 1948) is an American neurosurgeon, focusing in brain tumor management, Gamma Knife® stereotactic radiosurgery, movement disorders and trigeminal neuralgia and vascular malformations, currently the Lars Leksell Distinguished Professor at University of Pittsburgh. He is the 2017 recipient of the Herbert Olivecrona Award.
