= Michael T. Lawton =

American neurological surgeon

- Education: Johns Hopkins School of Medicine
- Occupation: Neurological surgeon
- Employer: Barrow Neurological Institute
- Website: www.barrowneuro.org/person/michael-lawton-md/

Michael T. Lawton is an American neurological surgeon. He serves as the president and CEO of Barrow Neurological Institute and the Robert F. Spetzler Chair in Neuroscience in the Department of Neurosurgery.

== Biography ==
Lawton received a degree in biomedical engineering from Brown University. He is a graduate of Johns Hopkins School of Medicine and completed a residency at Barrow in 1997 which included a fellowship with Robert F. Spetzler. He served as the vice chairman and chief of vascular neurosurgery at the UCSF for 20 years. He became the president and CEO of Barrow in 2017 when Spetzler retired.

Lawton has treated more than 1,400 cavernous malformations, 5,350 brain aneurysms, and 1,300 brain arteriovenous malformations. Throughout his career he has published more than 1,000 peer-reviewed articles as well as six single-author textbooks and more than 120 textbook chapters, and has an h-index over 112. He is the recipient of the prestigious Cushing Award from the American Association of Neurological Surgeons in 2023.

== Select publications ==
- 2008, Aneurysm Growth Occurs at Region of Low Wall Shear Stress. Patient-Specific Correlation of Hemodynamics and Growth in a Longitudinal Study
- 2004, Unique astrocyte ribbon in adult human brain contains neural stem cells but lacks chain migration
- 2001, Programmed cell death, mitochondria and the plant hypersensitive response
