= Reggi =

Reggi (Italian pronunciation: [ˈreddʒi]) is an Italian surname. Notable people with the surname include:

- Gustavo Reggi (born 1973), Argentinian football player
- Raffaella Reggi (born 1965), Italian tennis player
