= Rockefeller Neuroscience Institute =

West Virginia University Rockefeller Neuroscience Institute

Geography
- Location: 33 Medical Center Drive, Morgantown, West Virginia, United States
- Coordinates: 39.653290°N 79.960080°W

Organization
- Type: Research
- Affiliated university: West Virginia University

History
- Opened: 1999

Links
- Website: wvumedicine.org/rni
- Lists: Hospitals in West Virginia

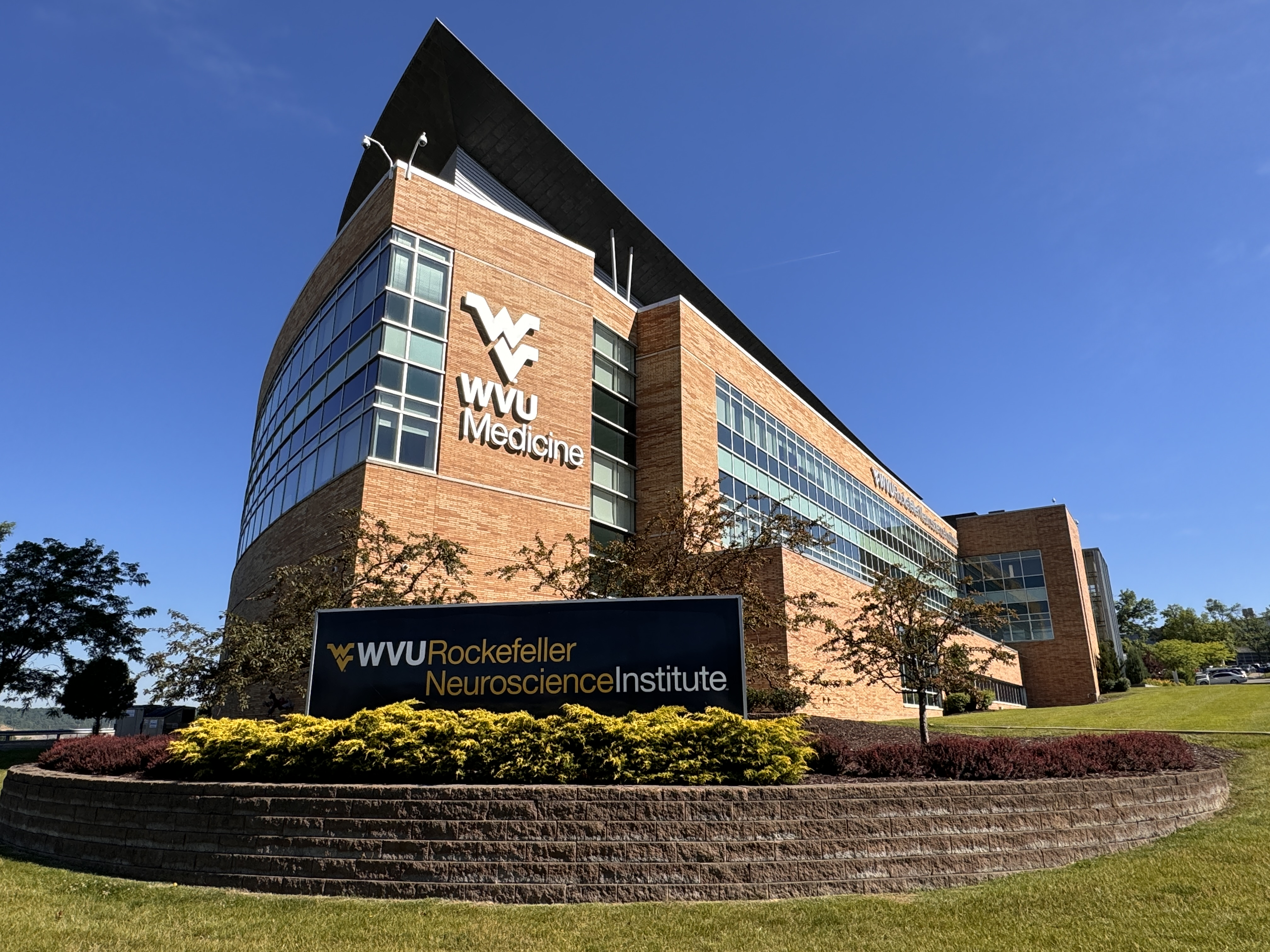
WVU Rockefeller Neuroscience Institute

The West Virginia University Rockefeller Neuroscience Institute is a clinical, academic, and research-focused organization affiliated with West Virginia University and WVU Medicine (the University's affiliated academic health system). Based in Morgantown, West Virginia, the Institute focuses on the study of neurological disorders, brain health, and memory diseases. The institute is one of the world's leading research centers focusing on innovative procedures to treat Alzheimer's disease and to expand clinical, research and academic missions of neurosurgery, neurology, behavioral medicine, psychiatry and other neuroscience issues.

== History ==
In 1999, United States Senator John Davison "Jay" Rockefeller IV and members of the Rockefeller family funded the formation of the Blanchette Rockefeller Neurosciences Institute on the Health Sciences campus of West Virginia University. The Institute was named in honor of Blanchette Ferry Rockefeller, his late mother, who died in 1992 following a ten-year battle with Alzheimer's disease. By 2001, the Rockefeller family had committed $15 million to the Institute, which inspired many additional donors to support the facility and its efforts to accelerate discovery of treatments and cures for neurological and psychiatric diseases. The $15 million gift was the founding endowment for the Institute to establish the world's first major research institute focused on the prevention, diagnosis, treatment and cure of neurological, psychiatric, and other cognitive disorders affecting the human brain, with an emphasis on Alzheimer's disease.

In 2016, the Blanchette Rockefeller Neurosciences Institute was acquired by and consolidated under West Virginia University and WVU Medicine and renamed the West Virginia University Rockefeller Neuroscience Institute.

In 2018, the Institute opened four state-of-the-art SMART neurosurgery operating rooms at its main campus to expand its capabilities in epilepsy surgery and deep brain stimulation.

In November 2025, the first "Brain Health Collaboratory" was launched at RNI, in partnership with Cognito Therapeutics. The new healthcare ecosystem merges clinical care, AI-powered research, and continuous data generation to accelerate discovery and delivery of non-drug neurotherapies. Spectris, Cognito’s investigational at-home neuroprotective device, uses non-invasive gamma frequency light and sound stimulation to evoke brain activity and is integrated into RNI’s clinical workflows.

== Leadership ==
In 2017, then West Virginia University President E. Gordon Gee announced the appointment of board-certified neurosurgeon Ali Rezai, M.D. to lead the Rockefeller Neuroscience Institute and oversee its efforts to develop solutions for neurological and psychiatric conditions. As executive chair of the Rockefeller Neuroscience Institute and the John D. Rockefeller IV Chair in neuroscience, Rezai is recognized as a pioneer in neuromodulation technologies to treat Parkinson's disease, obsessive–compulsive disorder, Alzheimer's disease and traumatic brain injury.

Rezai formerly served as director of Ohio State University's Wexner Medical Center's Neurological Institute, where he pioneered the use of neuromodulation technologies to treat Parkinson's disease, depression, obsessive–compulsive disorder and traumatic brain injury.

== Clinical trials ==
=== Alzheimer's ===
On October 16, 2018, a retired nurse diagnosed with Alzheimer's disease became the world's first person to undergo a Phase II clinical trial at the Rockefeller Neuroscience Institute of a new procedure using ultrasound waves to slow the effects of Alzheimer's. The procedure, requiring no incisions into the brain, applied a new use of an ultrasound helmet, called Exablate Neuro, with 1,022 probes combined with magnetic resonance imaging (MRI) to deliver low-intensity ultrasound waves that converge to target the hippocampus.

=== Chronic Pain & Opioid Use ===
On November 15, 2018, the Rockefeller Neuroscience Institute at West Virginia University became the first site in the nation to enroll a patient in a randomized Phase III clinical trial to reduce opioid use for chronic pain. The patient was injected in the lower back with a non-opioid, non-steroid clonidine micropellet to treat sciatica pain for up to one year. The trial marked an effort to reduce opioid use in West Virginia and the nation for chronic pain. Per capita, West Virginia has the highest number of opioid-addicted individuals.

On November 1, 2019, the institute's Executive Chair Dr. Ali Rezai surgically implanted a deep brain stimulator chip into the nucleus accumbens part of the human brain to reduce human cravings for drugs, particularly opioids. This marked the first time that deep brain stimulation was performed in the United States for drug addiction. West Virginia has the highest age-adjusted rate of drug overdose deaths involving opioids in the US, with a rate of 49.6 deaths per 100,000 persons in 2017, according to the National Institute on Drug Abuse.

=== Sleep ===
In May 2018, the institute began a clinical trial on sleep cycles with Thrive Global, the wellness company founded by Arianna Huffington.

== Curriculum ==
In April 2019, the West Virginia University Board of Governors created a new Department of Neuroscience in its School of Medicine to consolidate neuroscience education in neurology, neurosurgery, behavioral medicine and psychiatry and advance research in brain health and brain disorders.

== Campus ==
The Rockefeller Neuroscience Institute is located on West Virginia University's Health Sciences Campus, in Morgantown, West Virginia. Construction of the Institute began on May 1, 2006, at an initial cost of $30 million to build a state-of-the-art, four-story multidisciplinary laboratory space and administrative offices for 40 research scientists and 200 total employees. The institute's 87,000 square foot building was designed by Shepley Bulfinch Richardson and Abbott of Boston, Massachusetts. In 2019, a $25 million renovation was begun to expand the institute's research infrastructure.

On April 23, 2019, the West Virginia University Rockefeller Neuroscience Institute announced the opening of its new Innovation Center that is a dedicated building focused on the use of advanced technology for rapid applied human research in neuromodulation, virtual reality and neuroscience predictive data analytics.
