= Transcranial focused ultrasound =

- Other names: tFUS; Transcranial focused ultrasound stimulation
- Specialty: Psychiatry, neurology
- Uses: Psychiatric disorders; Neurological disorders

Transcranial focused ultrasound (tFUS), also known as transcranial ultrasound stimulation (TUS) or low-intensity focused ultrasound (LIFU), is a form of focused ultrasound (FUS) which is being investigated for the potential non-invasive treatment of psychiatric and neurological disorders. It has also been used as a tool to investigate causal effects of tFUS targeting subcortical brain structures in humans. It differs from other non-invasive brain stimulation methods such as magnetic (transcranial magnetic stimulation or TMS) and electrical (transcranial direct-current stimulation or tDCS) in that it has higher spatial resolution and precision (millimetric) and is able to reach deep brain structures. Depending on the parameters, tFUS can inhibit, stimulate, and even ablate brain tissue. Only a handful of clinical studies of tFUS for psychiatric conditions had been completed as of 2024. Of 150 trials launched since 2021, psychiatric disorders were the most common indication, comprising 32% of trials.

== Safety ==
The International consortium for Transcranial Ultrasound Stimulation Safety and Standards (ITRUSST) was formed in 2021, with the purpose of working towards the safe, effective and replicable application of transcranial ultrasonic stimulation for non-invasive neuromodulation in humans. In 2025, ITRUSST published a consensus on biophysical safety with a number of safety considerations for thermal and mechanical risks during tFUS. Based on the currently available regulations for other biomedical ultrasound devices, such as diagnostic ultrasound, the consensus proposes exposure levels under which the thermal and mechanical risks of TUS are considered nonsignificant. In order to estimate these exposure levels, software packages for numerical simulations of acoustic fields are often used.

== Neuromodulation tool ==
At lower acoustic intensities, generally below the FDA's 510(k) limit for diagnostic ultrasound of a Mechanical Index (MI) less than 1.9, tFUS can provide a neuromodulatory effect without causing permanent tissue damage. While the exact nature of tFUS neuromodulation is not completely understood, at least three mechanisms probably act in consort to produce the effects, all of which implicate the neuronal membrane.

1. Acoustic cavitation, the formation and subsequent implosion of bubbles in the membrane, may transiently disrupt its insulation or capacitance. However, since ultrasound neuromodulation has been described at intensities below those thought to cause cavitation, it is also possible that simple mechanical deformation of the membrane, mediated by the acoustic radiation force, causes the same effects.
2. Fluctuations in neural activity have been correlated to local temperature differences of less than 0.1C in the brain, providing a plausible mechanism in heating induced by the absorption of ultrasound energy interacting with tissue. Temperature increases may also increase mobility of lipid rafts and enzymes in the neuronal membrane.
3. Mechanosensitive ion channels in the neuronal membrane may react to the ordered mechanical deformation of ultrasound waves. Piezo1 has been shown to react to ultrasound stimulation in vitro.

Applications of tFUS neuromodulation in clinical practice may include treatment of essential tremor, treatment-resistant major depressive disorder (MDD), post-stroke chronic pain, epilepsy, obsessive-compulsive disorder (OCD), and anxiety.

== Advancements ==
A new form of transcranial ultrasound stimulation that can target areas 1,000 times smaller than conventional technology and is 30 times more precise than other approaches.
