= Congress of Neurological Surgeons =

Professional organization

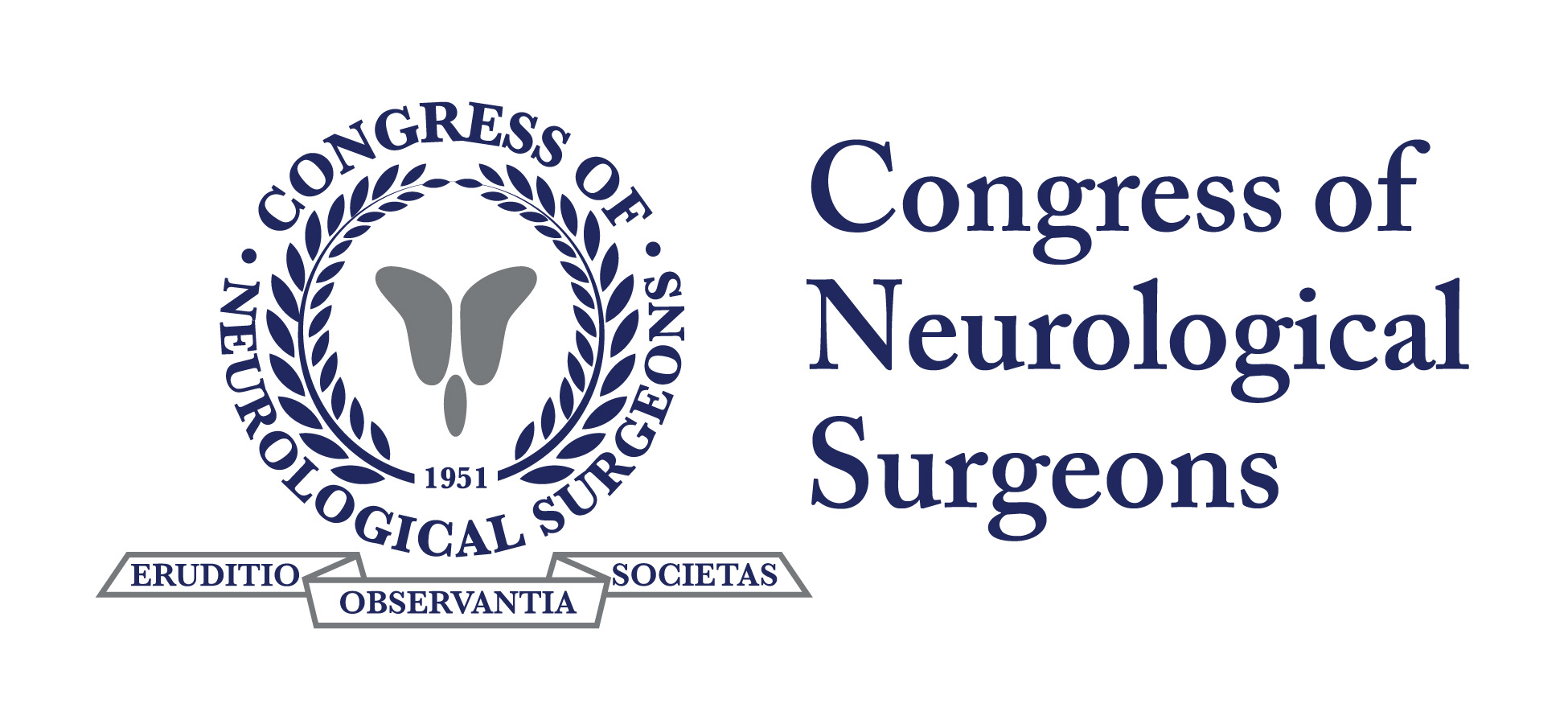
- Formation: 1951
- Type: Professional association
- Headquarters: Schaumburg, Illinois
- Region served: Worldwide
- Members: Over 10,000
- President: Daniel J. Hoh, MD, MBA
- Website: www.cns.org

The Congress of Neurological Surgeons (CNS) is a professional association representing neurosurgeons, neurosurgical residents, medical students, and allied health professionals.

== History ==
World War II produced a dramatic change in the world of neurological surgery. Deployed surgeons learned neurosurgery while on active duty in one of the armed services. Others experienced either abbreviated training, or had their program interrupted when called to active duty. After the war these surgeons returned to the United States with a need to add credentials. Existing neurosurgical training programs incorporated these surgeons and the number of training sites proliferated. Thus, in the late 1940s, the number of young neurosurgeons surfaced in communities and sought recognition from organized neurosurgical societies. There was intense resistance from the established neurosurgical community, however, to this new group of neurosurgeons. The Harvey Cushing Society (now the AANS), did not immediately recognize this new group of neurosurgeons and made efforts to exclude them from their organization. The precursor to the CNS was the Interurban Neurosurgical Society organized by neurosurgeons Adrian Verbrugghen and Harold Voris meeting at the University Club of Chicago. The society was open to all neurosurgeons living no more than one travel day away from Chicago. It met for one day only (Saturday). There was a mailing list but no dues, by-laws, officers or publications. About 150 neurosurgeons attended once a year. Most attendees were from the northeast, mid-Atlantic, southeast, and mid-west. Eventually, a more organized effort was put together when twenty two neurosurgeons met in St. Louis, Missouri. In 1951, the first formal organizing and scientific meeting was convened in Memphis, Tennessee, attended by 121 neurosurgeons. The CNS was infolded into the AANS for several years until it held its own independent meeting in 2000, completing the separation of the two organizations. The CNS has expanded significantly and now has over 10,000 members worldwide.

== Education and certification ==
The CNS has multiple efforts aimed at advancing neurosurgical education to practicing neurosurgeons, resident neurosurgeons, and medical students. These efforts include online products such as Nexus, assorted podcasts, and a variety of webinars, and live courses such as the Leadership in Healthcare course, the CNS Annual Meeting, and Self Assessment in Neurological Surgery. Many of these educational efforts provide credits for continuing medical education. The CNS also holds courses for written and oral board review, as well as webinars on these same and other topics. Board certified neurosurgeons must successfully pass a Maintenance of Certification exam in order to remain board certified by the American Board of Neurological Surgeons. A component of re-certification is successful completion of the Self Assessment in Neurological Surgery examination every 3 years.

The CNS Annual Meeting features sessions including dinner and luncheon seminars, case-based sessions, and the opportunity to share scientific abstracts with the community.

== Publications ==
The official medical journal of the CNS is Neurosurgery. The CNS also produces Clinical Neurosurgery, Operative Neurosurgery, and Neurosurgery Practice. Additionally, the CNS publishes CNS Quarterly, which updates members on various CNS activities including socio-economic and political activities of the organization on a quarterly basis.

Neurosurgery provides a medium for the prompt publication of scientific articles dealing with clinical or experimental neurosurgery, reviews, and other information of interest to neurosurgeons.

Operative Neurosurgery is focused on the technical aspects of the discipline featuring operative procedures, anatomy, instrumentation, devices, and technology. Operative Neurosurgery is the practical resource for material that connects the surgeon directly to the operating room.

Clinical Neurosurgery, published annually as a supplement to Neurosurgery, is the official register of the CNS Annual Meeting.

Neurosurgery Practice is an online-only, fully Open Access publication with all content publishing under the Creative Commons Attribution CC-BY-NC-ND, unless an alternative is required by a funding body. Content published in Neurosurgery Practice publishes on a rolling basis with issues closed quarterly. Neurosurgery Practice provides an outlet for the publication of scientific papers dealing with clinical neurosurgery and experimental neurosurgery, such as case series, clinical studies and other information of interest to neurosurgeons.

== Annual meeting ==
The CNS holds its five-day annual meeting in the autumn of each year. The meeting covers all aspects of neurosurgical research, including basic, translational, and clinical. Presentations are made in oral and poster format. Attending the annual meeting provides medical attendees with numerous continuing medical education credits. The meeting also features named lectures, notably Dandy Lecture, named in honor of neurosurgical pioneer Walter E. Dandy, and a Distinguished Service Award.

== Advocacy ==
The Washington Committee advocates for neurosurgery in the following areas:

- Medical malpractice reform
- Tort reform
- Adequate Medicare reimbursement
- Pay-for-performance issues
- Emergency Medical Treatment and Active Labor Act issues
- Patient safety issues

In addition, the Washington staff maintains the Neurosurgery Blog, which highlights the latest legislative activities affecting health care and the neurosurgical specialty.

== Founder's Laurel ==
Each year the CNS recognizes exceptional service, lifelong dedication, and meritorious accomplishments in the field of medical education with its Founder's Laurel award. Previous awardees have been:

Founder's Laurel Awardees and Presenters
Year	Presented to:	Presented by:
2004	David G. Piepgras, MD, FACS	Mark N. Hadley
2005	John A. Jane, Sr., MD, PhD, FRCS(C), FACS	Vincent C. Traynelis
2006	Albert L. Rhoton, MD	Nelson M. Oyesiku
2007	Tetsuo Kanno, MD	Nelson M. Oyesiku
2008	David G. Kline, MD	Richard G. Ellenbogen
2009	L. Nelson Hopkins, III, MD	Douglas Kondziolka
2010	Robert F. Spetzler, MD	Anthony L. Asher
2011	Ralph G. Dacey, Jr.	P. David Adelson
2012	Christopher C. Getch	Douglas Kondziolka
2013	Arthur Day	Christopher Wolfla
2014	Michael L.J. Apuzzo	Ali Rezai
2015	Edward R. Laws	Daniel Resnick
2016	H. Hunt Batjer	Nathan Selden
2017	Steven L. Giannotta	Russell R. Lonser
2018	A. Leland Albright	Alan Scarrow
2019	Daniel L. Barrow, MD	Ashwin Sharan
2020	2020 meeting canceled due to COVID-19	No award presented
2021	Steven Kalkanis	Beverly Walters

== Distinguished Service Award ==
The Distinguished Service Award is an award to honor the contributions and activities of outstanding individuals and members of the CNS. The legacy, accomplishments, and contributions of prior award recipients is remarkable.

Distinguished Service Awardees and Presenters
Year	Recipient	Presenter
1966	Lycurgus M. Davey	
1969	Walter S. Lockhart, Jr.	
1970	Edward J. Bishop	
1971	George Ablin	
1973	William S. Coxe	
1975	J. F. Ross Fleming	
1977	Perry Black	
1979	William A. Buchheit	
1980	Edwin Amyes	
1984	Edward F. Downing	
1986	J. Charles Rich	
1987	Ronald I. Apfelbaum	
1988	E. Fletcher Eyster	
1989	Fremont P. Wirth	
1990	Merwyn Bagan	
1992	Roy Black	
1993	Russell L. Travis	
1995	Steven Giannotta	
1996	John Thompson	
1997	Charles L. Plante	
1998	Robert H. Wilkins	
2000	Gregory D. Willard	Daniel L. Barrow, MD
2001	Dr. Richard Perrin	
2002	Laurie L. Behncke	Dr. Awad
2003	Katie O. Orrico, JD	Dr. Papadopoulos
2004	Albert L. Rhoton, Jr.	Dr. Hadley
2005	Beverly C. Walters	Dr. Traynelis
2006	CNS Auxiliary	Dr. Oyesiku
2007	Rodrick Faccio	Dr. Kondziolka
2008	Troy M. Tippett	Dr. Adelson
2009	ThinkFirst Foundation	Dr. Ellenbogen
2010	Alex B. Valadka	Dr. Kondziolka
2011	Mark E. Linskey	Dr. Asher
2012	Joel D. Macdonald	Dr. Rodts
2013	Regina Shupak	Dr. Rodts
2014	Jamie S. Ullman	Dr. Rezai
2015	Karin M. Muraszko	Dr. Chandler
2016	Mary Louise Spencer	Dr. Selden
2017	Richard Ellenbogen	Dr. Lonser
2018	Mark N. Hadley	Dr. Scarrow
2019	David Berg	Dr. Sharan
2020	2020 meeting canceled due to COVID-19	No award presented
2021	Nelson Oyesiku	Dr. Kalkanis
