= Annual BCI Research Award =

Annual award for brain-computer interface research

The BCI Research Award is an annual award for innovative research in the field of brain-computer interfaces. It is organized by the BCI Award Foundation. The prize is $3000 for first, $2000 for second, and $1000 for third place. The prizes are provided by g.tec medical engineering, an Austrian company that develops brain-computer interface, neurotechnology and EEG systems used worldwide in neuroscience, clinical applications, and Neuro-AI research. Christoph Guger and Dean Krusienski are the chairmen of the Foundation.

Since the COVID-19 pandemic, the Annual BCI Award Ceremony has been held online via Zoom. The ceremony takes place in conjunction with the annual IEEE SMC Conference.

The award winner is traditionally invited to present their work at the annual BCI & Neurotechnology Spring School. All nominated projects are published as chapters in the BCI State-of-the-Art book series. In addition, winners and nominees are featured in The Neurocareers: Doing The Impossible! Podcast, which highlights career paths, research insights, and developments in the field of brain-computer interfaces.
