= Robert F. Spetzler =

Neurosurgeon

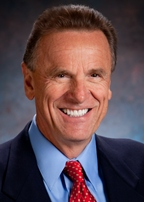
- Born: 1944 (age 81–82); Würzburg, Germany
- Education: Knox College (BS), Northwestern (MD)
- Scientific career
- Fields: Neurosurgery
- Workplaces: Barrow Neurological Institute University of California San Francisco

Robert F. Spetzler (born 1944) is a neurosurgeon and the J.N. Harber Chairman Emeritus of Neurological Surgery and director emeritus of the Barrow Neurological Institute in Phoenix, Arizona. He retired as an active neurosurgeon in July 2017. He is also Professor of Surgery, Section of Neurosurgery, at the University of Arizona College of Medicine in Tucson, Arizona.

Spetzler specialized in cerebrovascular disease and skull base tumors. Extremely prolific, he has published more than 580 articles and 180 book chapters and has co-edited multiple neurosurgical textbooks, including The Color Atlas of Microneurosurgery (2000). He retired from surgery in July 2019.

== Biography ==
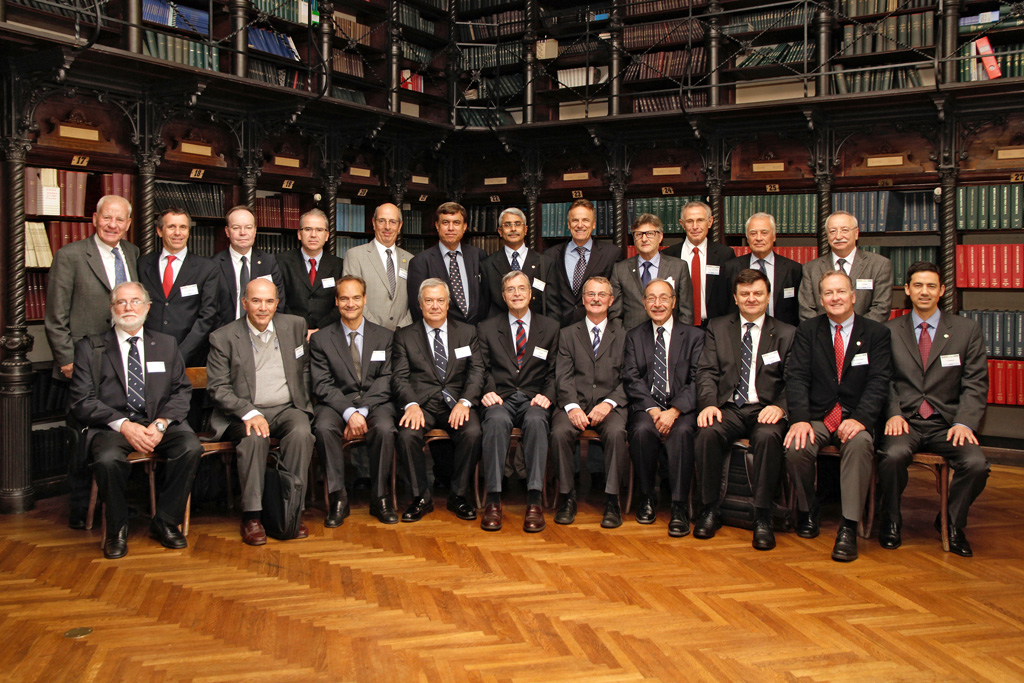
Spetzler can be seen standing in the middle.

Spetzler was born in Stierhöfstetten (Oberscheinfeld, near Würzburg) in Germany to where his parents had been evacuated due to the Second World War. When he was 11, he moved to the United States with his parents. He performed spectacularly in the American school system, despite the fact his first language was German.

Spetzler received his Bachelor of Science degree in 1967 from Knox College in Galesburg, Illinois after attending a year of community college in Illinois. He spent a year at the Free University of Berlin, and then entered medical school at the Northwestern Medical School in Chicago in 1967, receiving his M.D. in 1971. He completed post-graduate training at Wesley Memorial Hospital–Northwestern and a residency in neurosurgery at the University of California, San Francisco, training under Charles B. Wilson. In 1983, Spetzler was named Chair of the Division of Neurological Surgery at Barrow Neurological Institute. He was named director in 1986.

Spetzler played a dominant role in the use of the standstill operation in treating large or dangerous cerebral aneurysms. One notable application of this method occurred in 1991 when Spetzler successfully removed a large aneurysm in a 35-year-old American woman named Pam Reynolds. Prior to the operation proceeding, Reynolds was placed under general anesthesia, then had her eyes taped shut and a monitoring device placed in both of her ears. She was later induced into clinical death by Spetzler and his team, which was necessary for the operation to take place. Despite being clinically dead and under intense monitoring and medical observation whilst the procedure was ongoing, Reynolds claimed to have had a profound near-death experience in which she was able to accurately recall the sequence of events within the operating theater, the surgical instruments used, and the conversations that had taken place. In an interview that took place for a BBC documentary in 2002, Spetzler affirmed many of the observations that Pam had made, and later admitted that he had no explanation for them. In February 2007, Spetzler performed his 5,000th aneurysm procedure. He travels and lectures frequently on the most recent advances in neurosurgery. After 30 years at the Barrow, Spetzler retired in July 2019, with Michael T. Lawton as his successor.

== Awards ==
- 1977, Annual Resident Award, 27th Annual Meeting of the Congress of Neurological Surgeons
- 1994, Honored Guest, Congress of Neurological Surgeons (youngest surgeon to be so honored)
- 1999, Herbert Olivecrona Award, the "Nobel Prize of Neurosurgery"
- 2004, Honored Guest, 4th International Skull Base Congress
- 2009, William B. Scoville Award
- 2010, Founder's Laurel, Congress of Neurological Surgeons

== Selected publications ==
Spetzler has written more than 300 articles and 180 book chapters, as well as co-editing multiple neurosurgical textbooks. A partial list is below:

=== Books ===
- Surgery of the Cerebellopontine Angle. Nicholas C. Bambakidis (Author), Cliff A. Megerian (Author), Robert F. Spetzler (Author). Pmph USA; 2009. ISBN 1-60795-001-4
- Medicine, Miracles, and Manifestations: A Doctor's Journey Through the Worlds of Divine Intervention, Near-Death Experiences, and Universal Energy. John L. Turner (Author), Robert F. Spetzler (Foreword). Career Press; 2009. ISBN 1-60163-060-3
- The Color Atlas of Microneurosurgery W. Koos (Author), Robert Spetzler (Author), Johannes Lang (Author), J. Zabramski (Author), Robert F. Spetzler (Author), Joseph M. Zabramski (Author). Thieme; 2000. ISBN 0-86577-780-2.
- Pediatric Neurovascular Disease: Surgical, Endovascular and Medical Management. Michael Alexander (Editor), Robert Spetzler (Editor). Thieme; 2005. ISBN 1-58890-368-0

=== Articles ===
- Contralateral (July 2014). "surgical considerations and clinical outcomes in 31 consecutive cases. Zaidi HA, Chowdhry SA, Nakaji P, Abla AA, Spetzler RF". Neurosurgery. 75 (1): 80–6. doi:10.1227/NEU.0000000000000339. PMID 24618803.
- Cavalcanti, DD; Albuquerque, FC; Silva, BF; Spetzler, RF; Preul, MC (March 2010). "The anatomy of the callosomarginal artery: applications to microsurgery and endovascular surgery". Neurosurgery. 66: 602–10. doi:10.1227/01.NEU.0000365003.25338.62. PMID 20124934.
- Wait, SD; Abla, AA; Killory, BD; Starke, RM; Spetzler, RF; Nakaji, P (October 2010). "Safety of carotid endarterectomy while on clopidogrel (Plavix). Clinical article". J. Neurosurg. 113: 908–12. doi:10.3171/2009.12.JNS09707. PMID 20113164.
- Sankar, T; Delaney, PM; Ryan, RW; et al. (February 2010). "Miniaturized handheld confocal microscopy for neurosurgery: results in an experimental glioblastoma model". Neurosurgery. 66: 410–7, discussion 417–8. doi:10.1227/01.NEU.0000365772.66324.6F. PMID 20087141.
- Rigamonti, D; Hadley, MN; Drayer, BP; et al. (August 1988). "Cerebral cavernous malformations. Incidence and familial occurrence". N. Engl. J. Med. 319: 343–7. doi:10.1056/NEJM198808113190605. PMID 3393196.
- Bruneau, M; Sauvageau, E; Nakaji, P; et al. (February 2010). "Preliminary personal experiences with the application of near-infrared indocyanine green videoangiography in extracranial vertebral artery surgery". Neurosurgery. 66: 305–11, discussion 311. doi:10.1227/01.NEU.0000363596.52283.65. PMID 20087130.
- Pfisterer, WK; Nieman, RA; Scheck, AC; Coons, SW; Spetzler, RF; Preul, MC (January 2010). "Using ex vivo proton magnetic resonance spectroscopy to reveal associations between biochemical and biological features of meningiomas". Neurosurg Focus. 28: E12. doi:10.3171/2009.11.FOCUS09216. PMID 20043716.
- Supracerebellar (February 2010). "surgical variants and clinical experience with 45 patients. de Oliveira JG, Lekovic GP, Safavi-Abbasi S, Reis CV, Hanel RA, Porter RW, Preul MC, Spetzler RF". Neurosurgery. 66 (2): 389–99. doi:10.1227/01.NEU.0000363702.67016.5D. PMID 20042987.
