= Patrick J. Kelly (surgeon) =

American neurosurgeon

Patrick J. Kelly is a neurosurgeon in New York City.

He is Professor and Chairman of the Department of Neurosurgery at New York University School of Medicine. He has operated on almost 7,000 brain tumors and is considered an authority in the fields of brain tumor surgery, stereotactic neurosurgery and computer application in neurosurgery.

He has received Karolinska Institute's Olivecrona Prize, the World Federation of Neurological Societies' Scoville Achievement Award and the Irish Sir Peter Freyer Medal.

He has authored more than 230 scientific and clinical papers and book chapters and serves on the editorial boards of several scientific journals: Neurosurgery, Surgical Neurology, Journal of Stereotactic and Functional Neurosurgery and Neurological Research.

== Memberships ==
He is founder and president of the Brain Tumor Foundation. He is president of Re-Wired for Life Foundation, a non-profit foundation for patients undergoing deep brain stimulation and neuroaugmentative procedures. He is past president of the American Society for Stereotactic and Functional Neurosurgery and Vice-President of the World Society for Stereoencephalotomy. He was formerly a member of the medical advisory council of the Association for Brain Tumor Research, now known as the American Brain Tumor Association.
