= Alexander N. Konovalov =

Russian neuroscientist

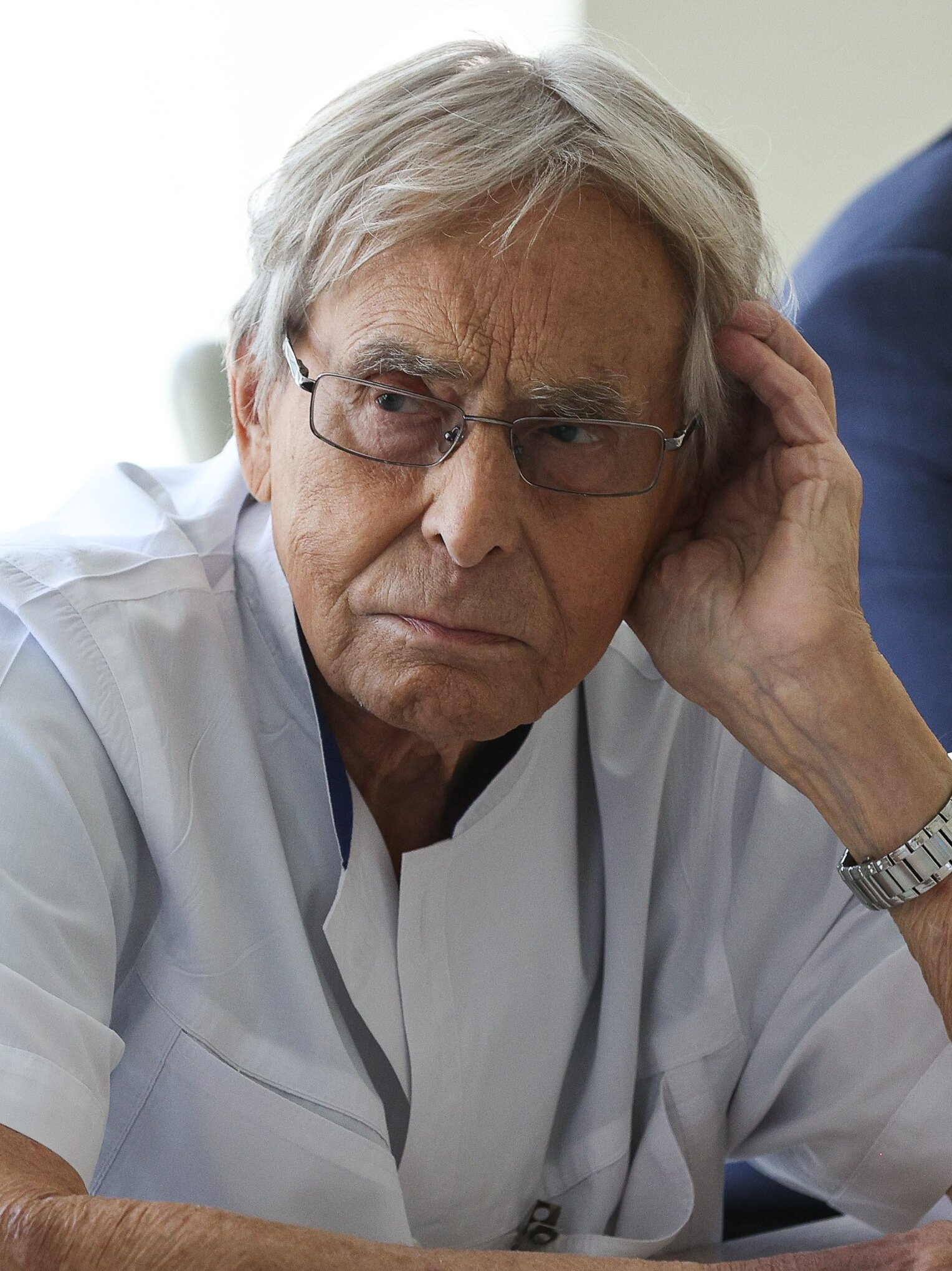
Konovalov in 2024.

Alexander N. Konovalov is a Russian neuroscientist who has been the director of the Burdenko Neurosurgery Institute for thirty-two years.

== Education ==
Konovalov graduated from the 1st Moscow Medical Institute named after I. M. Setchenov Upon graduation he entered training in the N. Burdenko Institute of Neurosurgery of RAMS of the USSR.

== Career ==
From 1966 to 1975 Konovalov was deputy director and from 1975 he is Director of the N. N. Burdenko Institute of Neurosurgery of RAMS. In 1974 he was elected as a Corresponding Member and in 1982 he became an Academician of the Academy of Medical Sciences of the USSR. Since 1994 he has been heading the Chair of pediatric neurosurgery at the Academy of Postgraduate Education. From 1972 until now he is editor-in-chief of the Journal Voprosy Neurokhirurgii.

In the period from 1981 to 1991 he was President of the All-Union Neurosurgical Society. Twice he was elected as vice-president of the World Federation of Neurosurgical Societies (1981-1985 and in 1993) and also two times as a vice-president of the European Association of Neurosurgical Societies (1975-1983 and 1987–1991).

== Accomplishments and awards ==
He is Honorary Member of the American Association of Neurological Surgeons and a member of some foreign neurosurgical societies. In 1999 he received Medal of Honor by the European Association of Neurosurgical Societies. He is a member of the Euroacademia Multidisciplinaries Neurotrauma-tologica - 2000. In 2000 he was elected as an academician of the RAS. Throughout his career, Konovalov has remained focused on his role as a surgeon. Along with colleagues at Burdenko, he refined many neurosurgical techniques. Examples include the infratentorial supracerebellar approach to the pineal region and third ventrical (12–14, 21), the combined transcallosal and subfrontal approach for removal of giant craniopharyngiomas involving the third ventricle, and craniofacial approaches to intracranial lesions. He has operated on more than 1000 patients with craniopharyngiomas. He successfully separated Siamese twins in 1989.

== Publications ==
He is author of about 243 scientific publications and twelve monographs. His main scientific interests are surgery of deep-seated tumors, pediatric neurosurgery, vascular surgery and head injury.
