= Neurosurgery (journal) =

- Discipline: Neurosurgery
- Language: English
- Edited by: Douglas Kondziolka

Publication details
- History: 1977–present
- Publisher: Lippincott Williams & Wilkins
- Frequency: Monthly
- Impact factor: 5.315 (2021)

Standard abbreviations
- ISO 4: Neurosurgery

Indexing
- CODEN: NRSRDY
- ISSN: 0148-396X (print); 1524-4040 (web)
- LCCN: 77643119
- OCLC no.: 03301698

Links
- Journal homepage; Online access; Online archive

Neurosurgery is a monthly peer-reviewed medical journal of neurosurgery and the official journal of the Congress of Neurological Surgeons. It is published by Lippincott Williams & Wilkins. The journal publishes original research, reviews, and editorials.

There are also two associated journals. The Operative Neurosurgery journal focuses on technical material that highlights operative procedures, anatomy, instrumentation, devices, and technology. There is also an online-only, open access journal Neurosurgery Practice (previously named "Neurosurgery Open") which was debuted in 2019.

== History ==
=== Founding (1970s) ===
Discussion about a new specialist journal began in 1973 at a Southern Neurosurgical Society meeting, held in New Orleans, Louisiana. For the next three years, negotiations took place to either purchase an existing journal or start a new one. In July 1976, during a meeting of the executive committee of the Congress of Neurological Surgeons, the decision to begin a new publication was made at the recommendation of the Congress' Publication Committee.

President Robert G. Ojemann made the announcement of its launch at the 26th Annual Meeting of the Congress of Neurological Surgeons on October 27, 1976 and the inaugural issue of Neurosurgery was published in July 1977 as a bimonthly publication. The journal shifted to monthly publication in 1979.

=== Recent years (2000–2023) ===
The magazine in recent years is published by Lippincott Williams & Wilkins.

The first supplement to Neurosurgery, named the Millennium Supplement, was published in September 2000.

Two associated journals debuted afterwards. The Operative Neurosurgery journal focuses on technical material that highlights operative procedures, anatomy, instrumentation, devices, and technology.

There is also an online-only, open access journal Neurosurgery Practice (previously named Neurosurgery Open) which was debuted in 2019.

== Editors-in-chief ==
The following individuals have been editor-in-chief of the journal:

- Robert Wilkins, 1977–1982
- Clark Watts, 1982–1987
- Edward Laws, Jr., 1987–1992
- Michael Apuzzo, 1992–2009
- Nelson Oyesiku, 2009–2022
- Douglas Kondziolka, 2022–present

== Impact factor ==
Neurosurgery has a 2021 impact factor of 5.315. It was ranked 26 out of 211 journals in the category "Surgery" and 52 out of 212 in the category "Clinical Neurology".

== Associated works ==
=== Podcast ===
In May 2010, the international podcast series was introduced with article abstracts from the current issue translated and read in eight languages (Spanish, French, Italian, Korean, Chinese, Japanese, Portuguese, and Russian).

=== Associated journals ===
- Operative Neurosurgery
- Neurosurgery Practice
