= American Brain Tumor Association =

American non-profit organization

- Abbreviation: ABTA
- Formation: 1973; 53 years ago
- Founders: Susan Netchin Kramer; Linda Gene Goldstein
- Type: Nonprofit organization
- Legal status: 501(c)(3) organization
- Purpose: Brain tumor research, patient education, advocacy, and support services
- Headquarters: Chicago, Illinois, U.S.
- Location: 8550 W Bryn Mawr Avenue, Suite 550, Chicago, Illinois 60631
- Region served: United States
- Key people: Kelly Sitkin (President and CEO)
- Website: www.abta.org

The American Brain Tumor Association (ABTA), founded in 1973, is the oldest national nonprofit organization in the United States dedicated to providing support services and programs to brain tumor patients and their families, as well as the funding of brain tumor research.

The organization is headquartered in Chicago, Illinois, at 8550 W Bryn Mawr Avenue.

The group's two founders were mothers of children who died from brain tumors.

== Services ==
The American Brain Tumor Association provides:

- A library of publications and resources covering general brain tumor information as well as tumor-specific and treatment-specific information
- Phone and email-based supportive care provided by a licensed health-care professionals.
- Funding for brain tumor research through a program that supports early career scientists and medical students, projects that transition laboratory science to actual patient treatment and care, discovery research, and data collection through the Central Brain Tumor Registry of the United States
- A website featuring tumor, treatment and support information and resources for patients, families, caregivers and health care professionals
- The Connections online support community
- TrialConnect, a free clinical trial matching service
- MyCaringLink, an online caregiver support tool
- National and regional meetings for patients and caregivers

== Mission ==
The American Brain Tumor Association provides research and treatment services to brain tumor patients. According to the Association, the organization's mission is "to advance the understanding and treatment of brain tumors with the goals of improving, extending and, ultimately, saving the lives of those impacted by a brain tumor diagnosis."

== Events ==
The Breakthrough for Brain Tumors 5K Run & Walk is a series of annual events held to support the ABTA's patient support and research funding programs. Events are held in six cities across the United States: Chicago, New York City, New York, Tampa, Florida, Los Angeles, Spokane, Washington and Ypsilanti, Michigan.

Team Breakthrough, the ABTA's running and endurance team, participates in marathons, half-marathons and triathlons across the United States to raise money for ABTA programs.

== Movie ==
ABTA produced an award-winning children's DVD/VHS movie titled Alex's Journey: the story of a child with a brain tumor.
