= The Society of Neurological Surgeons =

- Formation: 1920
- Type: Professional association
- Headquarters: Indianapolis, Indiana
- Region served: North America
- Members: 200 plus neurosurgeons
- President: E. Sander Connolly, Jr., MD

The Society of Neurological Surgeons (SNS) was founded in 1920 and is composed of neurosurgical department chairs, residency program directors and other senior educational leaders in America. It is the oldest neurosurgical professional organization in the world. The president of the SNS is E. Sander Connolly, Jr., MD. (Columbia University Irving Medical Center)

== History ==
The SNS began as a professional travel club "that held meetings twice a year with the goal that the small number of physicians who had chosen to be neurosurgeons would learn from one another". The membership of the SNS is limited to 200 active members, as well as senior, inactive and honorary members.

== Mission and objectives ==
The society holds as its principal mission the design of curriculum and implementation of neurosurgical residency and fellowship education in North America. The purpose of the society is to continue the traditions of the founding members that include:

"The continuing development of the field of neurological surgery including graduate and post-graduate education. To bestow recognition upon persons of outstanding ability and excellence in their work and teaching. Such recognition may be bestowed by appointment to membership or by appearance on the programs at appropriate times. To enhance the role and stature of neurosurgical units in academic medical centers.To insure that patients with nervous system disease received the highest quality of care. To encourage and support research in neurosciences."

== Notable members ==
Notable members of the society include the neurosurgeons Paul Bucy M.D., Eben Alexander Jr M.D, Ludwig G. Kempe M.D. and James I. Ausman M.D., PhD.
