= Narabayashi =

Narabayashi (written: 楢林 lit. "oak forest" or 奈良林) is a Japanese surname. Notable people with the surname include:

- Hiroki Narabayashi (奈良林 寛紀, born 1988), Japanese footballer
- Hirotaro Narabayashi (楢林 博太郎, 1922–2001), Japanese neurosurgeon
