= Diana Beck =

British neurosurgeon (1900-1956)

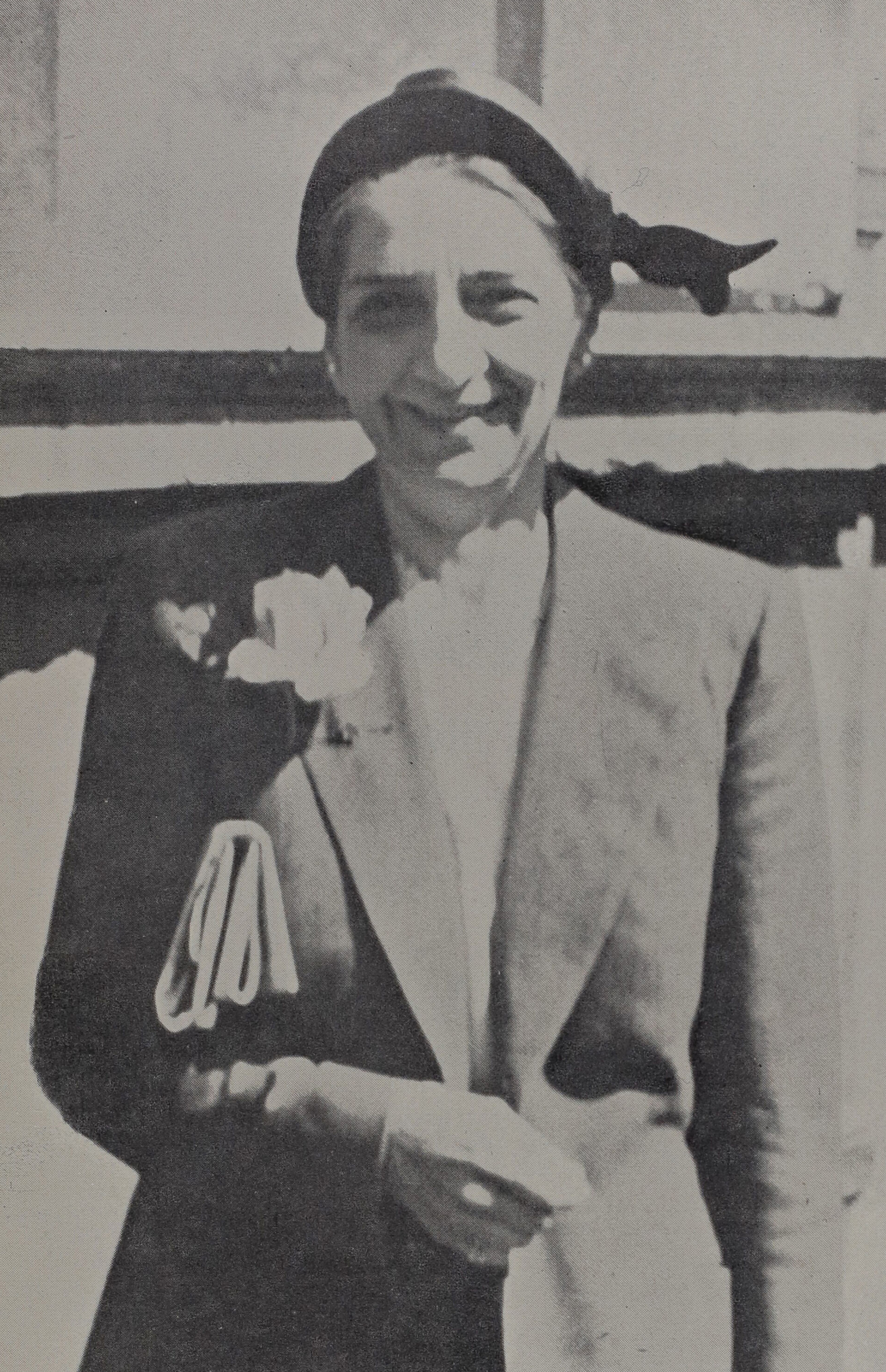
- Born: 29 June 1900; Hoole, Chester, England
- Died: 3 March 1956 (aged 55)
- Education: The Queen's School, Chester; London School of Medicine for Women
- Occupation: Neurosurgeon
- Medical career
- Profession: Surgeon
- Institutions: Radcliffe Infirmary, Oxford; Middlesex Hospital, London

Diana Jean Kinloch Beck (29 June 1900 or 1902 – 3 March 1956) was the first British female neurosurgeon. She established the neurosurgery service at the Middlesex Hospital in London. In 1952 she gained a public profile for performing life-saving surgery on A. A. Milne.

== Early life and education ==
Diana Beck was born on 29 June 1900, (Note: Beck's date of birth as per the Civil Registration of Births Index for England and Wales is 1900. This is reflected in the Oxford Dictionary of National Biography. Her date of birth on the plaque in the Fitzrovia Chapel was listed as 1902 and this date was used in the initial announcement of her blue plaque but the plaque date was then corrected to 1900.) in Hoole, Chester, to James Beck, a tailor, and Margaret Helena Kinloch. She attended The Queen's School before studying medicine at the London School of Medicine for Women, where she won two prizes and a scholarship.

== Medical career ==
Beck's skill in surgery was recognised by Louisa Aldrich-Blake and after graduating in 1925, Beck was house surgeon at the Elizabeth Garrett Anderson Hospital and then at the Royal Free Hospital. Beck took time away from her career to care for her mother who was seriously ill. She then worked in general practice in Wrexham before returning to the Royal Free as Surgical Registrar from 1932 to 1936.

Beck chose to specialise in neurosurgery and trained under Hugh Cairns at the Radcliffe Infirmary in Oxford, where she also acted as a general surgeon providing treatment to injured soldiers during the war. In 1939, she was awarded the William Gibson Research Scholarship for Medical Women by the Royal Society of Medicine, and used the grant to undertake research in Oxford with Dorothy Stuart Russell. Using animal experiments, they investigated the causes of idiopathic intracranial hypertension and experimented with various graft materials for cranioplasty.

In 1943, Beck was appointed consultant neurosurgeon at the Elizabeth Garrett Anderson and the Royal Free, but war damage meant that she was unable to establish her new department. In 1944, she was sent to Chase Farm Hospital, where she took charge of air-raid casualties with head injuries and notably performed a lengthy operation that saved a nurse whose brain was protruding from her skull and was expected to die. Beck then went to Bristol as Regional Adviser in Neurosurgery to the emergency medical service for south-west England, working at the Burden Neurological Institute and travelling to consult around the area.

Beck became a consultant neurosurgeon at Middlesex Hospital in 1947, making her the first female consultant at a London teaching hospital that did not admit women students. At Middlesex, she was the first woman and the first neurosurgeon on staff, as well as being the only consultant neurosurgeon in western Europe and North America at the time. Beck set up and ran the neurosurgery service at Middlesex, and published important research on the management of intracerebral haemorrhage.

In 1952 Beck received attention in the press for performing lifesaving surgery on A. A. Milne, the author of Winnie-the-Pooh, two months after he suffered a brain haemorrhage. The Times praised her "remarkable piece of surgery". According to his son Christopher, after the stroke and surgery he remained "partly paralyzed" with a "distinct change in character", though he survived a further three years.

Beck was the President of the London Association of the Medical Women's Federation for two years.

== Possible world’s first female neurosurgeon ==
A 2008 profile in Neurosurgery credits Beck as the world's first female neurosurgeon. The claim has also been made for the Romanian Sofia Ionescu, although the author notes that Ionescu only finished medical school in 1945, when Beck was already working as a consultant in neurosurgery. The World Federation of Neurosurgical Societies recognizes Beck as the first British woman neurosurgeon.

== Personal life ==
Beck was considered skilled in drawing and needlework, hobbies which complemented the skills necessary for surgery.

== Death and legacy ==
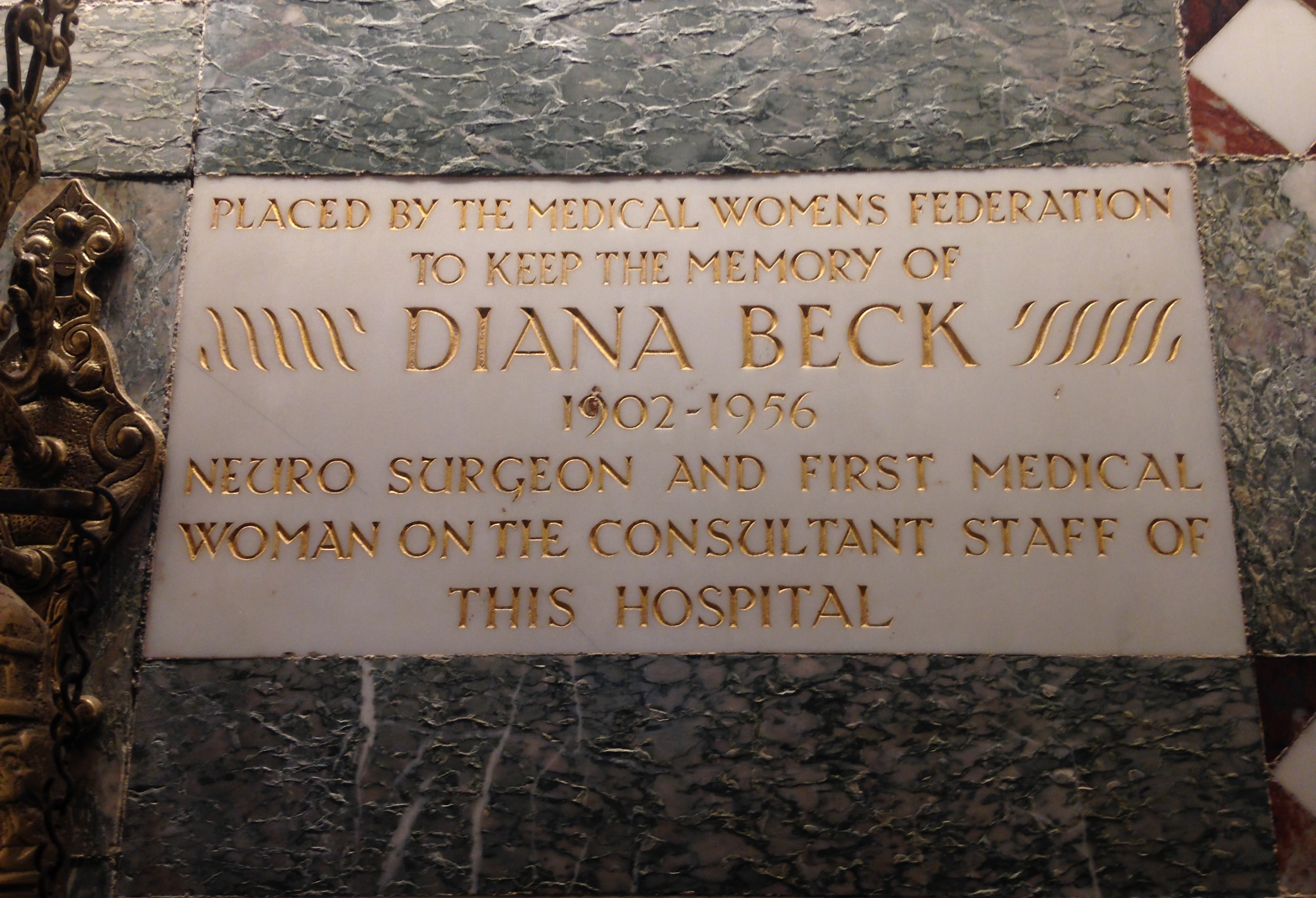
Diana Beck memorial plaque at Fitzrovia Chapel

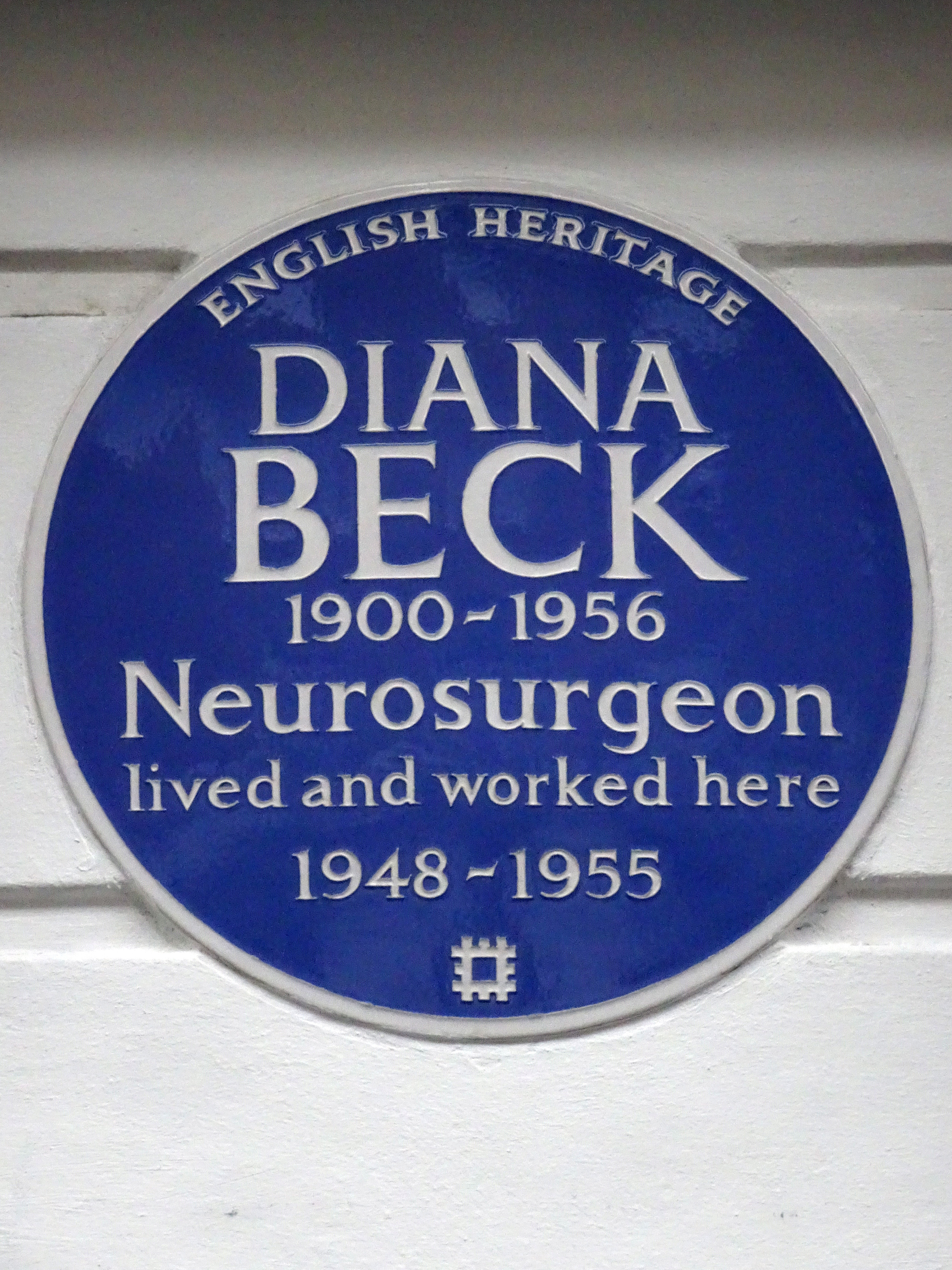
English Heritage blue plaque for Beck in the city of Westminster

Beck suffered from myasthenia gravis and underwent a thymectomy in 1956 to treat a myasthenic crisis. She died at the Middlesex Hospital soon after the procedure from a pulmonary embolism on 3 March 1956.

She is commemorated with a plaque in the Fitzrovia Chapel, part of the Middlesex Hospital, an English Heritage blue plaque put up in 2024, and a plaque in Walton Centre.

The Operating Theatre department of Liverpool's Walton Centre hospital, which is the NHS' only specialist Neuroscience Trust, was renamed the Beck Theatre Department in her honour.

== Selected publications ==
- Beck, Diana J. Kinloch (1946). "The Diagnosis of Tumours of the Central Nervous System". Bristol Medico-Chirurgical Journal (1883). 63 (226): 65–72. ISSN 0007-019X. PMC 5064532. PMID 20275464.
- Beck, Diana J. Kinloch (1947). "Upper Parietal Meningioma Showing Foster Kennedy Syndrome*A case shown at the Clinical Meeting of the Society on Wednesday, December 11th, 1946". Bristol Medico-Chirurgical Journal (1883). 64 (229): 11–12. ISSN 0007-019X. PMC 5065820. PMID 20247986.
- Beck, Diana J. K. (April 1951). "Cervical Hæmatomyelia Causing Profound Tetraplegia and Loss of Sensation in a Patient with Congenital Heart Disease. Recovery after Operation". Proceedings of the Royal Society of Medicine. 44 (4): 333–335. doi:10.1177/003591575104400418. ISSN 0035-9157. PMC 2081659. PMID 14844222.
- Beck, Diana (August 1952). "Unilateral Pulsating Exophthalmos Associated with Multiple Bony Tumours (Some Pulsating) and a Nodular Thyroid Swelling". Proceedings of the Royal Society of Medicine. 45 (8): 507–509. doi:10.1177/003591575204500814. ISSN 0035-9157. PMC 1987572. PMID 12993804.
