= Mohana Rao Patibandla =

Indian neurosurgeon

- Born: Andhra Pradesh, India
- Occupations: Neurosurgeon, Entrepreneur
- Known for: Founder of Dr. Rao’s Hospital
- Website: https://www.drraoshospitals.com/

Mohana Rao Patibandla is an Indian neurosurgeon based in Guntur, Andhra Pradesh. He is the founder of Dr. Rao's Hospital, a medical facility providing neurological and neurosurgical services.

His published research includes studies of stereotactic radiosurgery for meningiomas, cerebral arteriovenous malformations, and Cushing's disease. In 2018, he received the Brainlab Neurosurgery Award at the annual meeting of the Congress of Neurological Surgeons.

== Education and training ==
Patibandla completed his Bachelor of Medicine, Bachelor of Surgery (MBBS) at Andhra Medical College in Visakhapatnam in 2002. He subsequently studied neurosurgery at the Nizam's Institute of Medical Sciences in Hyderabad, completing his Master of Chirurgiae (MCh) in 2013.

Following his postgraduate education, he undertook additional training in India and the United States. His reported training included skull base and epilepsy surgery in Hyderabad, pediatric neurosurgery in Colorado, minimally invasive skull base surgery in Ohio, and neurosurgical subspecialty training in Virginia.

His research affiliations have included the Department of Neurological Surgery at the University of Virginia, where he collaborated on studies involving stereotactic radiosurgery and cerebrovascular conditions.

== Career ==
Following his training in the United States, Patibandla returned to Andhra Pradesh. In 2020, he established Dr. Rao's Hospital in Guntur, focusing on neurology, neurosurgery, and spinal disorders.

In September 2023, The Hindu reported that two patients from outside India had travelled to Guntur for medical treatment at the hospital. Another report in The New Indian Express identified the patients as coming from the United Kingdom and the Netherlands.

In March 2024, The Hindu reported that Patibandla had announced the use of the BrainPath surgical system by his team at Dr. Rao's Hospital. The report described the hospital's use of the minimally invasive technique for brain surgery.

== Research ==
Patibandla has authored and co-authored clinical studies published in neurosurgical and medical journals. His research has included stereotactic radiosurgery for intracranial tumors, cerebral vascular malformations, and endocrine conditions.

=== Stereotactic radiosurgery for meningiomas ===
In 2017, Patibandla, Cheng-Chia Lee, and Jason Sheehan published a study in World Neurosurgery examining long-term outcomes of stereotactic radiosurgery for central skull base meningiomas. The retrospective study included 219 patients and assessed tumor response using volumetric imaging measurements.

In 2018, he was the lead author of a study in the Journal of Neurosurgery investigating long-term outcomes of stereotactic radiosurgery for World Health Organization grade I posterior fossa meningiomas.

He also co-authored an international multicenter study published in the Journal of Neurosurgery that examined stereotactic radiosurgery for foramen magnum meningiomas.

=== Cerebrovascular and endocrine research ===
In 2018, Patibandla was the lead author of a multicenter study in the Journal of Neurosurgery concerning stereotactic radiosurgery for Spetzler–Martin grade IV and V cerebral arteriovenous malformations. The research examined treatment outcomes and factors associated with radiosurgical response.

He also contributed to a 2017 multicenter study published in The Journal of Clinical Endocrinology & Metabolism concerning stereotactic radiosurgery for Cushing's disease. The study evaluated endocrine outcomes, recurrence, and treatment-related complications.

=== Pediatric neurosurgery ===
Patibandla co-authored a 2016 study in the Journal of Neurosurgery: Pediatrics examining clinical characteristics and outcomes of atypical pediatric gangliogliomas. The retrospective study evaluated children treated at Children's Hospital Colorado.

== Awards and conference presentations ==
=== Brainlab Neurosurgery Award ===
In 2018, Patibandla received the Brainlab Neurosurgery Award at the Congress of Neurological Surgeons annual meeting for research titled "Stereotactic Radiosurgery for Skull Base Meningiomas: 20-year Long-term Outcomes with Volumetric Analysis".

The award is documented by the American Association of Neurological Surgeons/Congress of Neurological Surgeons Section on Tumors, including its official award-recipient listing and Spring 2019 newsletter.

=== Spine surgery research awards ===
In August 2026, The Hindu reported that Patibandla had received three conference awards for research on minimally invasive spine surgery at a joint meeting of the Pacific and Asian Society of Minimally Invasive Spine Surgery (PASMISS), Minimally Invasive Spine Surgeons Association of Bharat (MISSAB), and Chennai Ortho Spine Society (COSSCON) in Chennai.

The reported awards were the PASMISS Best Free Paper Award, MISSAB Best Free Paper Award, and COSSCON Best Paper Gold Medal. The research concerned surgical approaches for selected craniovertebral junction disorders.

=== Society of British Neurological Surgeons meeting ===
In October 2026, The Hindu reported that Patibandla had presented research at the centenary meeting of the Society of British Neurological Surgeons in London.

The presentation concerned a six-case study of transnasal endoscopic odontoidectomy in patients with persistent craniovertebral junction compression following previous posterior fusion procedures.
