= Stereotaxis =

Stereotaxis may refer to:

- Any of various stereotactic techniques or procedures:
  - Stereotactic surgery, any of various minimally invasive surgery types that make use of a three-dimensional coordinate system to locate small targets for ablation, biopsy, injection, stimulation, implantation, or radiosurgery
    - Stereotactic radiosurgery, a type of radiosurgery
    - Stereotactic biopsy
    - Stereotactic injection
  - Stereotactic radiation therapy, a form of external-beam radiotherapy
- Stereotaxis (company), which makes robotic products for electrophysiology studies
