= Dopamine transporter deficiency syndrome =

Movement disorder

- Other names: Infantile parkinsonism-dystonia
- Symptoms: Rigidity, tremors, slowness of movement, parkinsonism, dystonia
- Usual onset: <6 months
- Causes: Autosomal recessive SLC6A3 mutation
- Diagnostic method: Molecular genetic screening

Dopamine transporter deficiency syndrome (DTDS), also known as infantile parkinsonism-dystonia, is a rare movement disorder that causes progressively worsening dystonia and parkinsonism. It is the first known inherited dopamine 'transportopathy.'

DTDS is an extremely rare disease; only about 20 affected individuals have been described in the medical literature. Researchers believe this condition is likely underdiagnosed because its signs and symptoms overlap with other movement disorders, including cerebral palsy.

The onset of DTDS is a continuum that ranges from early-onset DTDS (in the first 6 months) to atypical later-onset DTDS (in childhood, adolescence, or adulthood).

== Signs and symptoms ==
The main symptom of DTDS, presenting in 80–99% of DTDS patients, is parkinsonism. This is a neurological anomaly resulting from degeneration of dopamine-generating cells in the substantia nigra, and is characterized by shaking and tremors, rigidity, slowness of movement, and difficulty with walking and gait.

Various other symptoms present less commonly (30–79%), including bradykinesia (slowness of movement), acid reflux, muscular hypertonia, and chorea.

== Causes ==
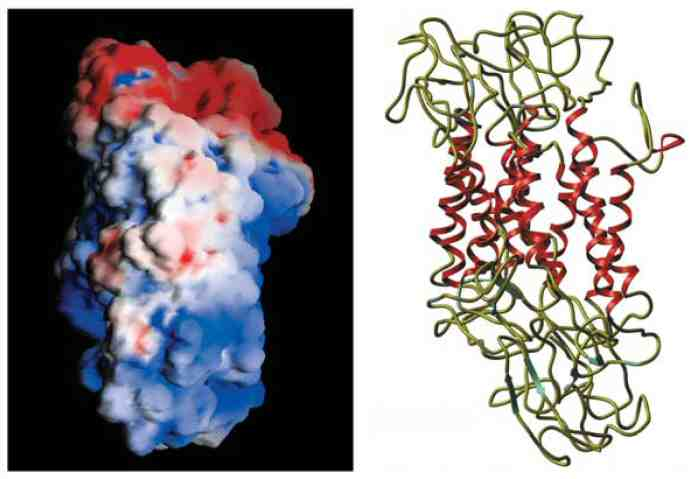
The dopamine transporter protein, pictured here, is mutated in DTDS patients.

DTDS is caused by mutations in the SLC6A3 gene, which codes for the dopamine transporter protein DAT. In contrast to various mutations that up-regulate DAT activity, which is implicated in clinical depression, this mutation results in DAT down-regulation and, consequently, DTDS. Known DTDS-related SLC6A3 mutations include:

- R85L
- A314V
- G386R
- R445C
- Y470S

In vitro replication of SLC6A3 mutations like those present in DTDS demonstrate multifaceted loss of dopamine transporter functions. Dopamine intake is universally impaired. These mutants also demonstrated diminished dopamine binding affinity, reduced cell surface transporter, loss of post-translational dopamine transporter glycosylation, and failure of amphetamine-mediated dopamine efflux.

The age at which signs and symptoms appear seems to be related to the severity of DAT dysfunction. Early-onset DTDS movement problems in infancy most often have transporter activity that is less than 5 percent of normal. Those whose movement problems appear in childhood or later tend to have somewhat higher levels of transporter activity, although they are still lower than normal. Researchers speculate that higher levels of transporter activity may delay the onset of the disease in these individuals.

DTDS is inherited in an autosomal recessive pattern, which means, for affected individuals, both copies of the gene in each cell have SLC6A3 mutations. As such, each sibling of an affected individual has a 25% chance of being affected, a 50% chance of being an asymptomatic carrier, and 25% chance of being unaffected and not a carrier. Once a SLC6A3 pathogenic variant is identified within an affected family member, carrier testing for at-risk relatives and prenatal testing or preimplantation genetic diagnosis for pregnancies can be options considered for genetic counseling.

== Diagnosis ==
Diagnosis of SLC6A3-negative DTDS is established in a proband via molecular genetic testing, looking for biallelic (i.e. homozygous or compound heterozygous) pathogenic SLC6A3 variants. DTDS-positive patients are further identified by matching their genetic testing results with known characteristic clinical, laboratory, and imaging findings.

To date, another potential diagnostic tool is neurotransmitter analysis of patient cerebrospinal fluid. All individuals tested with classical early-onset, SLC6A3-related DTDS display raised homovanillic acid (HVA) levels with normal 5-hydroxyindoleacetic acid (5-HIAA, a serotonin metabolite) levels. DTDS patients demonstrate a HVA:5-HIAA ratio of 5.0-13.0, above the normal range of 1.0-4.0. In addition, the patients have normal pterin profiles.

Mutant constructs of human dopamine transporter can be used for in vitro functional analysis of any particular mutant's dopamine uptake and cocaine-analogue binding.

== Treatment ==
A multidisciplinary approach to long-term management of this progressive disorder is optimal. Treatment can be split into three categories: treatment of DTDS manifestations, prevention of secondary complications, and monitoring of overall disease progression.

=== Manifestations ===
Treatment to control the chorea and dyskinesia in the early stages of DTDS is done with tetrabenazine and benzodiazepines. The dystonia is more difficult to control and the first-line agents include pramipexole and ropinirole; adjuncts include trihexyphenidyl, baclofen, gabapentin, and clonidine for severe dystonia, and chloral hydrate and benzodiazepines for exacerbations of dystonia or status dystonicus.

=== Prevention of secondary complications ===
Regular physiotherapy is recommended to reduce the risk of contractures, shortening and hardening of the muscles. Feeding may become difficult and alternative feeding strategies including nasogastric tubes or percutaneous endoscopic gastrostomies may become necessary due to progressive bulbar dysfunction. The influenza vaccine is used in combination with prophylactic antibiotics to prevent chest infections.

=== Monitoring ===
Patients are evaluated every six to 12 months for early evidence of hip dislocation and spinal deformities. Risk of pulmonary aspiration is evaluated with regular swallowing assessments. Nutritional assessments are performed regularly to ensure adequate caloric intake.

=== Treatment ===
Preliminary experiments have examined the potential of drugs to act as pharmacological chaperones of DAT to rescue DTDS mutations. Bupropion and ibogaine appear to promote DAT maturation and functional activity by acting as pharmacological chaperones in the endoplasmic reticulum. These two drugs rescue DAT maturation and functional activity of two DTDS-associated mutations (A314V and R445C). Preclinical experiments in mice have demonstrated efficacy and safety of a potential treatment using stereotactic injection of AAV vector to deliver working copies of the DAT gene.

== Society and culture ==
=== Support organizations ===
A variety of support and advocacy groups exist to connect with other patients and families or provide valuable services.

- International Parkinson and Movement Disorder Society
- Parkinson & Movement Disorder Alliance
- Parkinson's Foundation
- Pediatric Neurotransmitter Disease Association
