= Polyaxial screw =

Orthopedic screw

A polyaxial screw is used for connecting vertebrae to rods in spinal surgery, particularly spinal fusion procedures. It is a type of screw whose spherical head is enclosed in a housing, which allows the screw a range of motion along several different axes relative to the housing. The ball joint allows the surgeon some flexibility in placing the screws. The screws are typically placed into the pedicle of the vertebra.

It has also been hypothesized that polyaxial screws add a safety benefit by failing in the housing/screw interface before breaking in the shaft of the bone screw or in the orthopaedic rod. Unlike standard lateral mass plate and screw systems, the new cervical polyaxial screw and rod system easily accommodates severe degenerative cervical spondylosis and curvatures. This instrumentation system allows for polyaxial screw placement with subsequent multiplanar rod contouring and offset attachment.
