= Neurosurgery =

Medical specialty of disorders which affect any portion of the nervous system

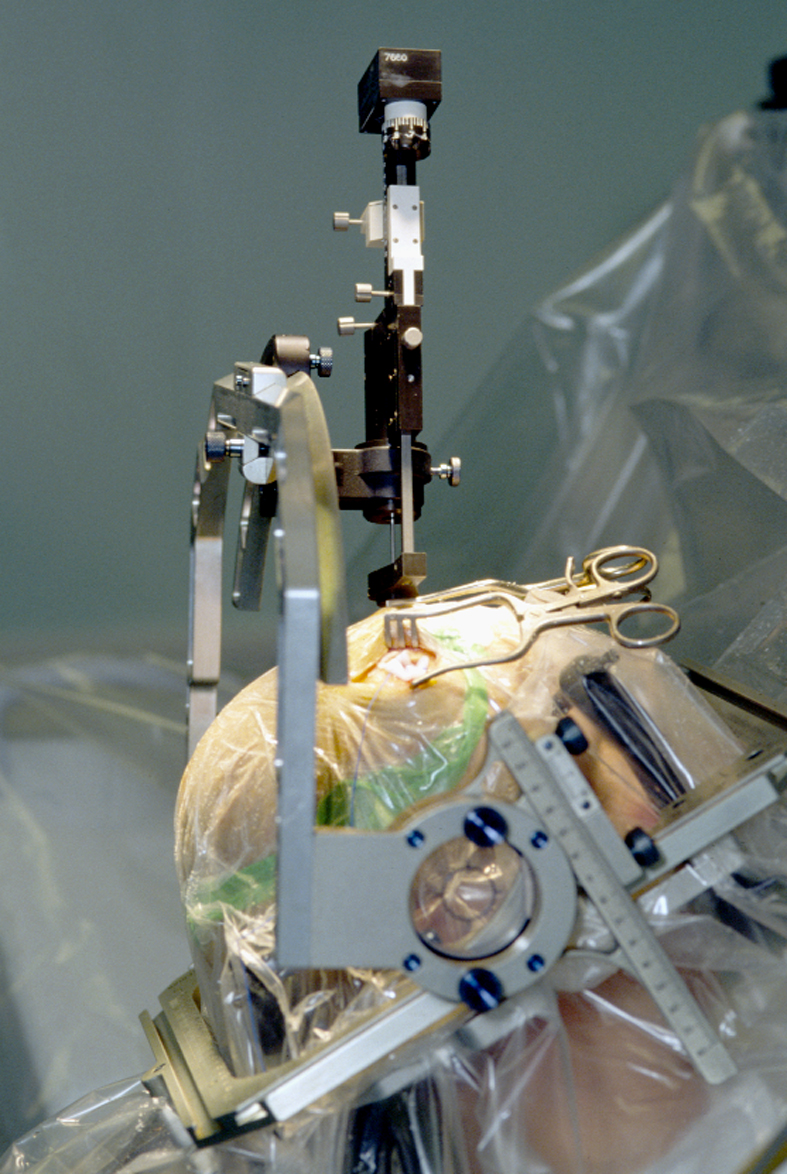
- Stereotactic guided insertion of DBS electrodes in neurosurgery

Occupation
- Activity sectors: Surgery

Description
- Education required: Doctor of Medicine (M.D.) or Doctor of Osteopathic Medicine (D.O.) with Residency in Neurosurgery; or: Bachelor of Medicine, Bachelor of Surgery (M.B.B.S.) with Residency in Neurosurgery or Fellowship of the Royal College of Surgeons (F.R.C.S.); or: Master of Surgery (M.S.) / Magister Chirurgiae (M.Ch.)
- Fields of employment: Hospitals, clinics

Neurosurgery or/and neurological surgery, also known in common parlance as brain surgery, is the medical specialty that focuses on the surgical treatment or rehabilitation of disorders that affect any portion of the nervous system, including the brain, spinal cord, peripheral nervous system, and cerebrovascular system. Neurosurgery as a medical specialty also includes non-surgical management of some neurological conditions.

== Education and context ==
In different countries, there are different requirements for an individual to legally practice neurosurgery, and there are varying methods through which they must be educated. In most countries, neurosurgeon training requires a minimum period of seven years after graduating from medical school.

=== Canada ===
In Canada, neurosurgery residency is overseen by the Royal College of Physicians and Surgeons of Canada (RCPSC). To qualify, candidates must hold a Doctor of Medicine (M.D.) degree and be licensed physicians. The residency program lasts six years, often with one year of mandatory research, as in the University of Calgary, and it comprises two years of Surgical Foundations and four years of specialized neurosurgery training. Admission is facilitated through the Canadian Resident Matching Service (CaRMS), which matches candidates to programs based on academic credentials, interviews, and references. Training requirements and certification processes differ slightly in Quebec, where the Quebec College of Physicians (CMQ) collaborates with RCPSC, but has French-language proficiency requirement and has a different application procedure. Upon completion, residents take the RCPSC examination to earn the Fellowship of the Royal College of Physicians and Surgeons of Canada (FRCSC) designation.

On the other hand, to qualify for residency, International Medical Graduates must pass equivalent licensing exams, including the Medical Council of Canada Qualifying Examination Part I (MCCQE Part I) and the National Assessment Collaboration (NAC) Objective Structured Clinical Examination, to be eligible for residency. They apply through CaRMS, where competition is high, and may face additional requirements in Quebec due to French language fluency expectations.

=== India ===
In India, neurosurgery training is overseen by the National Medical Commission (NMC) and the qualifying examinations by National Board of Examinations in Medical Sciences (NBEMS). To qualify, candidates must hold a Bachelor of Medicine, Bachelor of Surgery (MBBS) degree with at least 55% aggregate marks from a WHO-recognized institution, complete a one-year compulsory rotating internship, and possess a practising medical license. The pathway spans three to six years post-MBBS. A three-year residency cum degree of Master of Surgery (M.S.) in neurosurgery is the basic qualification of a neurosurgeon in India. Physicians can opt for super specialization of three years, i.e., Master of Chirurgiae (M.Ch.) after completing Master of Surgery (M.S.) in General Surgery or Neurosurgery. Qualifying exams for specialisation (M.S.) are — NEET (PG) for admission into general medical colleges and INI CET for admission into Institutes of National Importance, such as AIIMS, JIPMER, NIMHANS, and PGIMER. Super speciality selection exams are NEET SS and INI SS similarly. Neurosurgery is considered one of the most competitive specialities in India with fewer than 200 seats annually. Foreign Medical Graduates (FMG) are required to pass the FMGE for registration into postgraduate training.

=== United Kingdom ===
In the United Kingdom, students must gain entry into medical school. The MBBS qualification (Bachelor of Medicine, Bachelor of Surgery) takes four to six years, depending on the student's route. The newly qualified physician must then complete foundation training lasting two years; this is a paid training program in a hospital or clinical setting covering a range of medical specialties, including surgery. Junior doctors then apply to enter the neurosurgical pathway. Unlike most other surgical specialties, it currently has its own independent training pathway, which takes around eight years (ST1-8) before being able to sit for consultant exams with sufficient amounts of experience and practice behind them. Neurosurgery remains consistently amongst the most competitive medical specialties in which to obtain entry.

=== United States ===
In the United States, a neurosurgeon must generally complete four years of undergraduate education, four years of medical school, and seven years of residency (PGY-1-7). Most, but not all, residency programs have some component of basic science or clinical research. Neurosurgeons may pursue additional training in the form of a fellowship after residency, or, in some cases, as a senior resident in the form of an enfolded fellowship. These fellowships include pediatric neurosurgery, trauma/neurocritical care, functional and stereotactic surgery, surgical neuro-oncology, radiosurgery, neurovascular surgery, skull-base surgery, peripheral nerve and complex spinal surgery. Fellowships typically span one to two years. In the U.S., neurosurgery is a very small, highly competitive specialty, constituting only 0.5 percent of all physicians.

== History ==
Neurosurgery, or the premeditated incision into the head for pain relief, has been around for thousands of years, but notable advancements in neurosurgery have only come within the last hundred years.

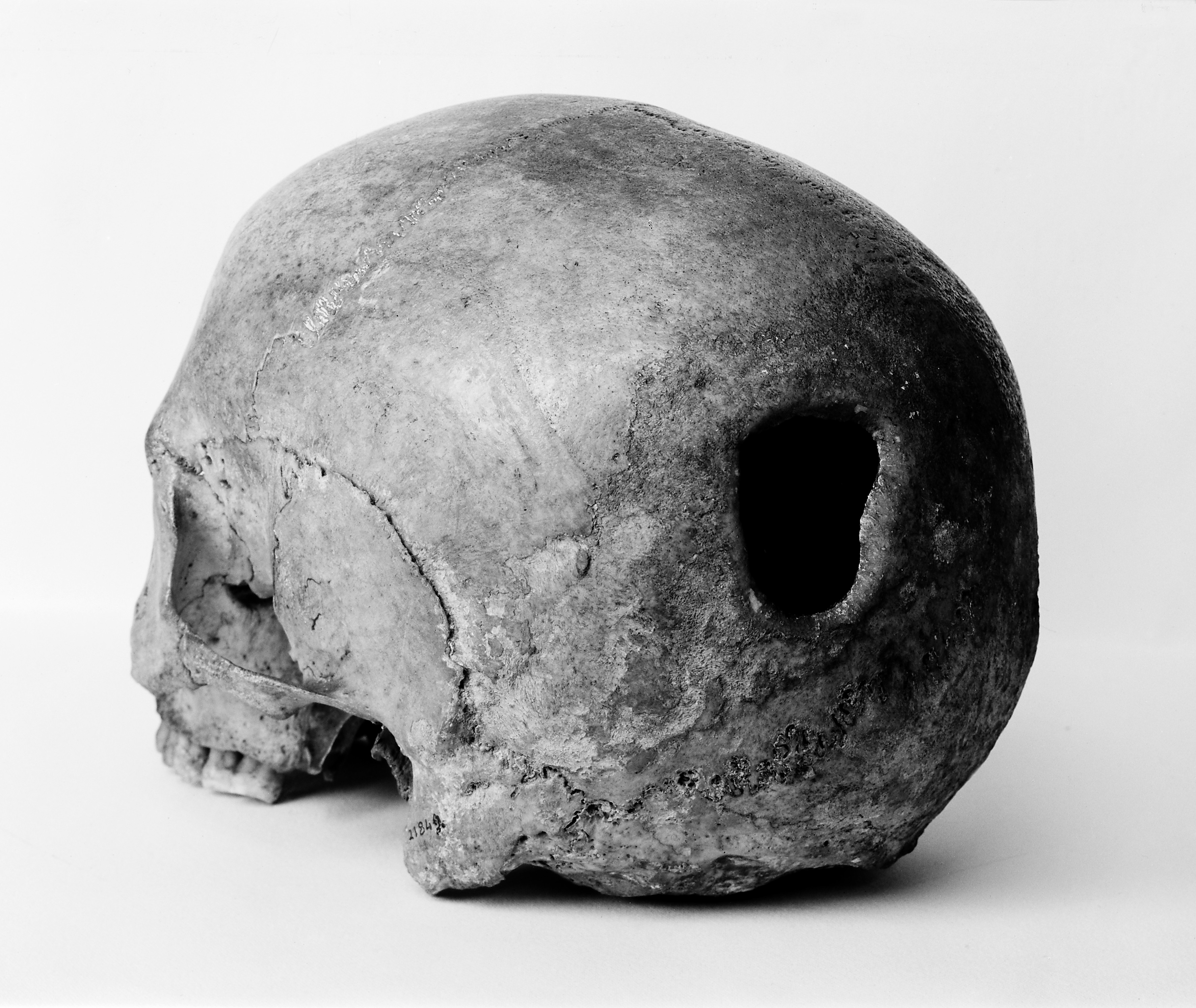
Trepanned skull from Edinburgh

=== Ancient ===
Neurosurgical procedures in rudimentary forms date back to antiquity. In the Roman Empire, doctors and surgeons performed neurosurgery on depressed skull fractures. Additionally, the Incas appear to have practiced a procedure known as trepanation since before European colonization. During the Middle Ages in Al-Andalus from 936 to 1013 AD, Al-Zahrawi performed surgical treatments of head injuries, skull fractures, spinal injuries, hydrocephalus, subdural effusions, and headache. Simple forms of neurosurgery were performed on King Henry II of France in 1559, after a jousting accident with Gabriel de Lorges, Count of Montgomery, which fatally wounded him. Ambroise Paré and Andreas Vesalius, both experts in their fields at the time, attempted their own methods (although to no avail) in curing Henry. In China, Hua Tuo invented the first general anesthesia called mafeisan, which he used on surgical procedures on the brain.

=== Modern ===
History of tumor removal: In 1879, after locating it via neurological signs alone, Scottish surgeon William Macewen (1848–1924) performed the first successful brain tumor removal. On November 25, 1884, after English physician Alexander Hughes Bennett (1848–1901) used Macewen's technique to locate it, English surgeon Rickman Godlee (1849–1925) performed the first primary brain tumor removal, which differs from Macewen's operation in that Bennett operated on the exposed brain, whereas Macewen operated outside of the "brain proper" via trepanation. On March 16, 1907, Austrian surgeon Hermann Schloffer became the first to successfully remove a pituitary tumor.

Lobotomy, also known as leucotomy, was a form of psychosurgery, a neurosurgical treatment of mental disorders that involves severing connections in the brain's prefrontal cortex. The originator of the procedure, Portuguese neurologist António Egas Moniz, shared the Nobel Prize in Physiology or Medicine of 1949. Some patients improved in some ways after the operation, but complications and impairments – sometimes severe – were frequent. The procedure was controversial from its initial use, in part due to the balance between benefits and risks. Nowadays, it is predominantly rejected as a form of medical treatment and is non-compliant with patients' rights.

History of electrodes in the brain: In 1878, Richard Caton discovered that electrical signals were transmitted through an animal's brain. In 1950, Jose Delgado invented the first electrode that was implanted in an animal's brain (a bull), using it to make it run and change direction. In 1972, the cochlear implant, a neurological prosthetic that allowed deaf people to hear, was marketed for commercial use. In 1998, researcher Philip Kennedy implanted the first Brain Computer Interface (BCI) into a human subject.

2010 survey of the 100 most cited works in neurosurgery shows that the works primarily cover clinical trials evaluating surgical and medical therapies, descriptions of novel neurosurgical techniques, and descriptions of systems classifying and grading diseases.

=== Modern surgical instruments ===
Modern neurosurgical instruments
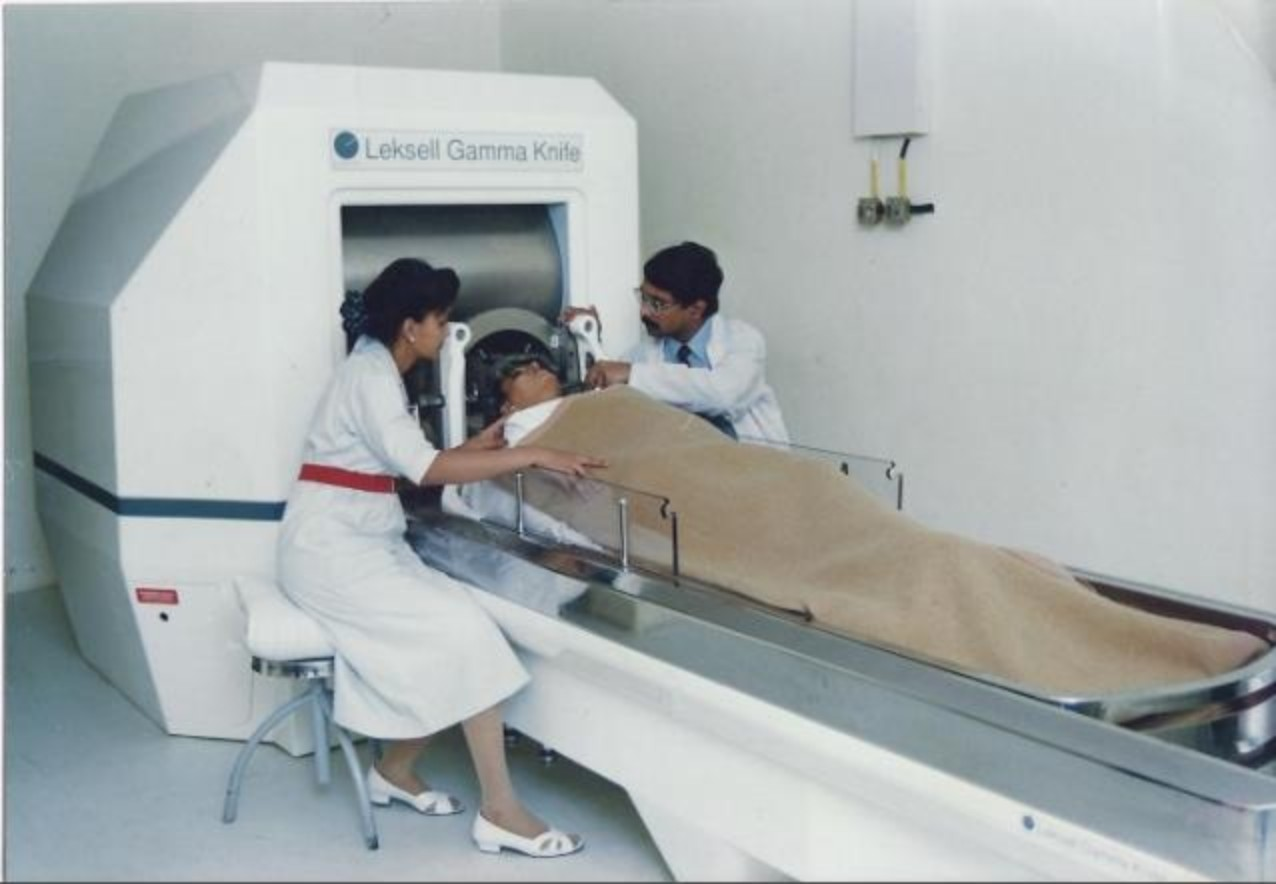
A doctor performing stereotactic gamma knife radiosurgery, a non-invasive procedure

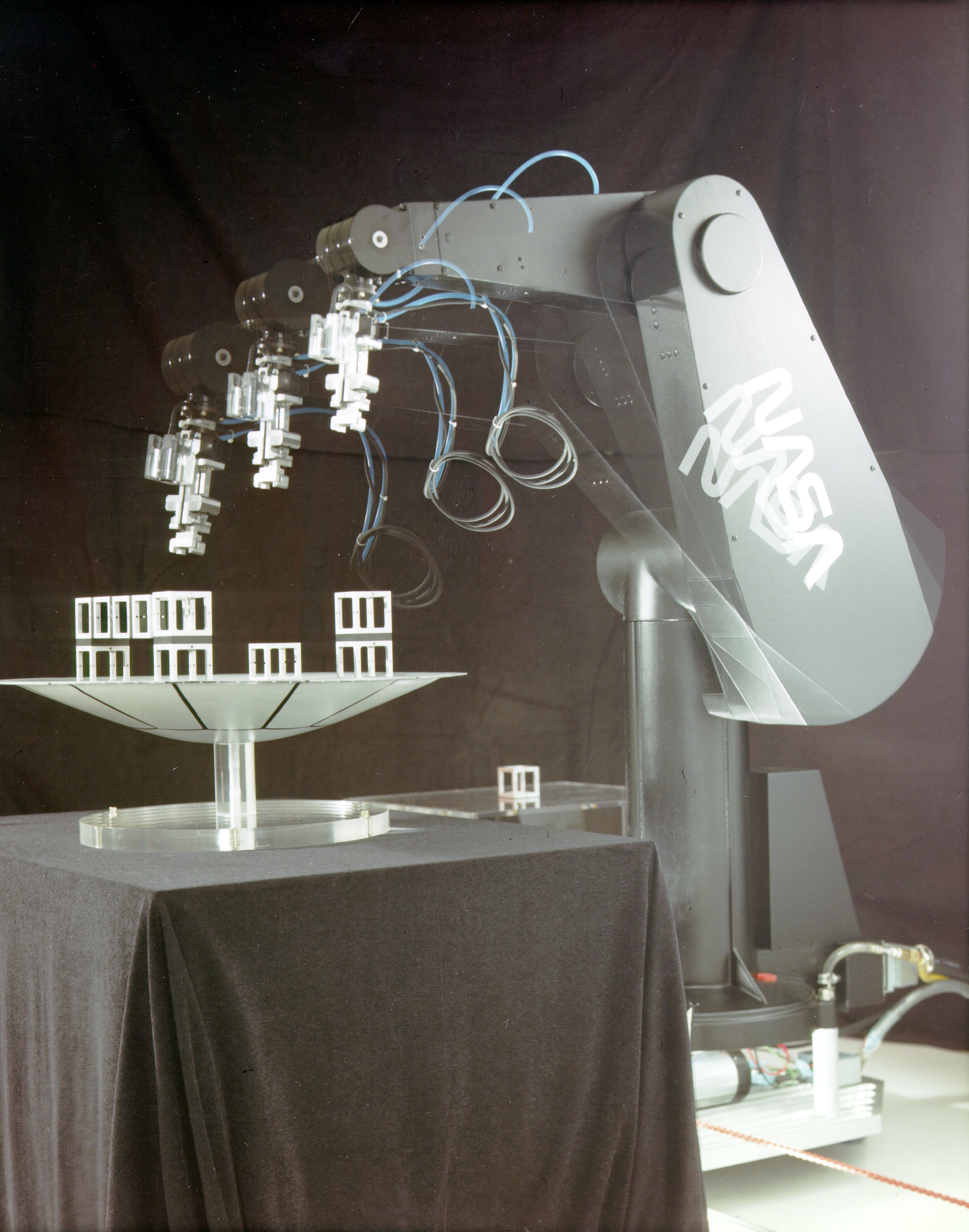
Puma Robotic Arm

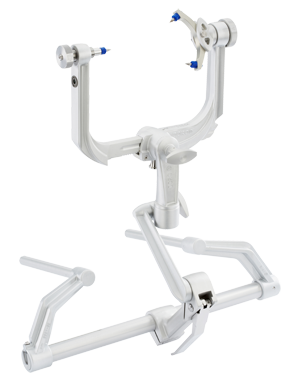
Aluminum Mayfield skull clamp

The main advancements in neurosurgery came about as a result of highly crafted tools and technological developments. Modern neurosurgical tools, or instruments, include chisels, curettes, dissectors, distractors, elevators, forceps, hooks, impactors, probes, suction tubes, power tools, and robots. Most of these modern tools have been in medical practice for a relatively long time. The main difference between these tools in neurosurgery was the precision with which they were crafted. These tools are crafted with edges that are within a millimeter of the desired accuracy. Other tools, such as handheld power saws and robots, have only recently been commonly used inside of a neurological operating room. As an example, the University of Utah developed a device for computer-aided design / computer-aided manufacturing (CAD-CAM) which uses an image-guided system to define a cutting tool path for a robotic cranial drill.

== Organised neurosurgery ==
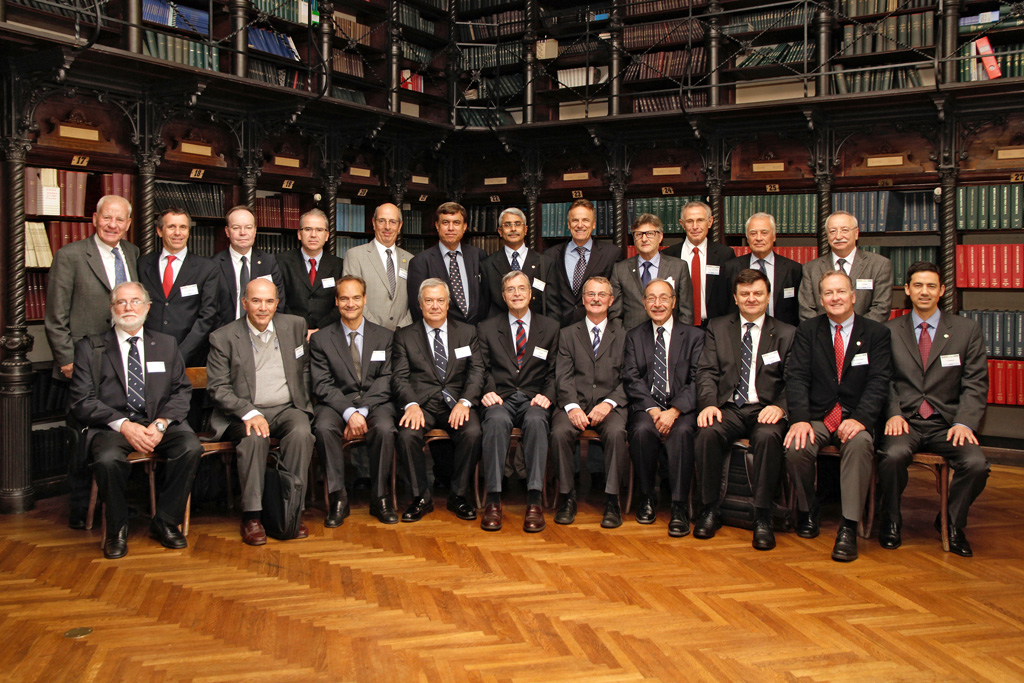
World Academy of Neurological Surgery's conference

The World Federation of Neurosurgical Societies (WFNS) was founded in 1955 in Switzerland as a professional, scientific, non-governmental organization. It is composed of 130 member societies: consisting of 5 Continental Associations (AANS, AASNS, CAANS, EANS, and FLANC), six affiliate societies, and 119 national neurosurgical societies, representing some 50,000 neurosurgeons worldwide. It has a consultative status in the United Nations. The official journal of the Organization is World Neurosurgery. The other global organisations are the World Academy of Neurological Surgery (WANS) and the World Federation of Skull Base Societies (WFSBS).

== Main divisions ==
General neurosurgery involves most neurosurgical conditions, including neurotrauma and other neuro-emergencies such as intracranial hemorrhage. Most level 1 hospitals have this kind of practice.

Specialized branches have developed to cater to special and difficult conditions. These specialized branches co-exist with general neurosurgery in more sophisticated hospitals. To practice advanced specialization within neurosurgery, additional higher fellowship training of one to two years is expected from the neurosurgeon. Some of these divisions of neurosurgery are:

- Vascular neurosurgery includes clipping of aneurysms and performing carotid endarterectomy (CEA).
- Stereotactic neurosurgery, functional neurosurgery, and epilepsy surgery (the latter includes partial or total corpus callosotomy – severing part or all of the corpus callosum to stop or lessen seizure spread and activity, and the surgical removal of functional, physiological and/or anatomical pieces or divisions of the brain, called epileptic foci, that are operable and that are causing seizures, and also the more radical and rare partial or total lobectomy, or even hemispherectomy – the removal of part or all of one of the lobes, or one of the cerebral hemispheres of the brain; those two procedures, when possible, are also very, very rarely used in oncological neurosurgery or to treat very severe neurological trauma, such as stab or gunshot wounds to the brain)
- Oncological neurosurgery, also called neurosurgical oncology; includes pediatric oncological neurosurgery; treatment of benign and malignant central and peripheral nervous system cancers and pre-cancerous lesions in adults and children (including, among others, glioblastoma multiforme and other gliomas, brain stem cancer, astrocytoma, pontine glioma, medulloblastoma, spinal cancer, tumors of the meninges and intracranial spaces, secondary metastases to the brain, spine, and nerves, and peripheral nervous system tumors)
- Skull base surgery
- Spinal neurosurgery
- Peripheral nerve surgery
- Pediatric neurosurgery (for cancer, seizures, bleeding, stroke, cognitive disorders or congenital neurological disorders)

=== Commonly performed surgeries ===
According to an analysis by the American College of Surgeons National Surgical Quality Improvement Program (NSQIP), the most common surgeries performed by neurosurgeons in between 2006 and 2014 were the following:

- Anterior cervical discectomy and fusion (ACDF)
- Craniotomy for brain tumor (CBT)
- Discectomy
- Laminectomy
- Posterolateral lumbar fusion (PLF)

== Neuropathology ==
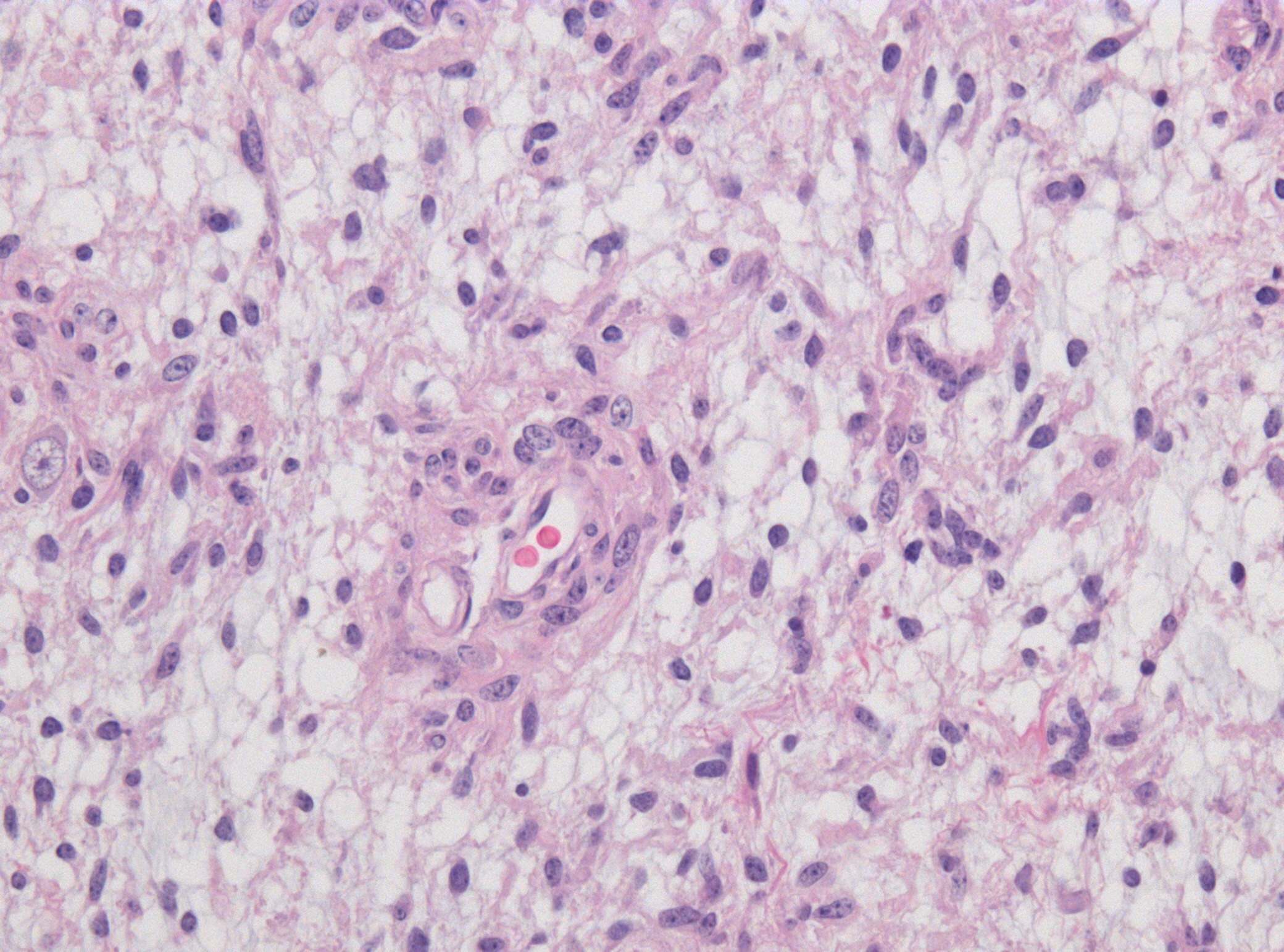
Histopathology specimen of Angiocentric glioma, higher magnification, HE stain

Neuropathology is a specialty within the study of pathology focused on the diseases of the brain, spinal cord, and neural tissue. This includes the central nervous system and the peripheral nervous system. Tissue analysis comes from either surgical biopsies or post-mortem autopsies. Common tissue samples include muscle fibers and nervous tissue. Common applications of neuropathology include studying samples of tissue in patients who have Parkinson's disease, Alzheimer's disease, dementia, Huntington's disease, amyotrophic lateral sclerosis, mitochondrial disease, and any disorder that has neural deterioration in the brain or spinal cord.

=== History ===
While pathology has been studied for millennia only within the last few hundred years has medicine focused on a tissue- and organ-based approach to tissue disease. In 1810, Thomas Hodgkin started to look at the damaged tissue for the cause. This was conjoined with the emergence of microscopy and started the current understanding of how the tissue of the human body is studied.

== Neuroanesthesia ==
Neuroanesthesia is a field of anesthesiology which focuses on neurosurgery. Anesthesia is not used during the middle of an "awake" brain surgery. Awake brain surgery is where the patient is conscious for the middle of the procedure and sedated for the beginning and end. This procedure is used when the tumor does not have clear boundaries and the surgeon wants to know if they are invading on critical regions of the brain which involve functions like talking, cognition, vision, and hearing. It will also be conducted for procedures which the surgeon is trying to combat epileptic seizures.

=== History ===
The physician Hippocrates (460–370 BCE) made accounts of using different wines to sedate patients while trepanning. In 60 CE, Dioscorides, a physician, pharmacologist, and botanist, detailed how mandrake, henbane, opium, and alcohol were used to put patients to sleep during trepanning. In 972 CE, two brother surgeons in Paramara, now India, used "samohine" to sedate a patient while removing a small tumor, and awoke the patient by pouring onion and vinegar in the patient's mouth. The combination of carbon dioxide, hydrogen, and nitrogen, was a form of neuroanesthesia adopted in the 18th century and introduced by Humphry Davy.

== Neurosurgery methods ==
Neurosurgery
- ICD-10-PCS: 00-01
- ICD-9-CM: 01–05
- MeSH: D019635
- OPS-301 code: 5-01...5-05

=== Imaging and navigation ===
Various Imaging methods are used in modern neurosurgery diagnosis and treatment. They include computer assisted imaging computed tomography (CT), magnetic resonance imaging (MRI), positron emission tomography (PET), magnetoencephalography (MEG), and stereotactic surgery. Some neurosurgery procedures involve the use of intra-operative MRI and functional MRI.

Using stereotaxy neurosurgeons can approach a minute target in the brain through a minimal opening. This is used in functional neurosurgery where electrodes are implanted or gene therapy is instituted with high level of accuracy as in the case of Parkinson's disease or Alzheimer's disease. Using the combination method of open and stereotactic surgery, intraventricular hemorrhages can potentially be evacuated successfully. Conventional surgery using image guidance technologies is also becoming common and is referred to as surgical navigation, computer-assisted surgery, navigated surgery, stereotactic navigation. Similar to a car or mobile Global Positioning System (GPS), image-guided surgery systems, like Curve Image Guided Surgery and StealthStation, use cameras or electromagnetic fields to capture and relay the patient's anatomy and the surgeon's precise movements in relation to the patient, to computer monitors in the operating room. These sophisticated computerized systems are used before and during surgery to help orient the surgeon with three-dimensional images of the patient's anatomy including the tumor.

=== Surgical approaches (open, microscopic, endoscopic) ===
In conventional neurosurgery the neurosurgeon opens the skull, creating a large opening to access the brain. Techniques involving smaller openings with the aid of microscopes and endoscopes are now being used as well. Methods that utilize small craniotomies in conjunction with high-clarity microscopic visualization of neural tissue offer excellent results. However, the open methods are still traditionally used in trauma or emergency situations.

Microsurgery is utilized in many aspects of neurological surgery. Microvascular techniques are used in EC-IC bypass surgery and in restoration carotid endarterectomy. The clipping of an aneurysm is performed under microscopic vision. Minimally-invasive spine surgery utilizes microscopes or endoscopes. Procedures such as microdiscectomy, laminectomy, and artificial disc replacement rely on microsurgery.

Minimally invasive endoscopic surgery is commonly utilized by neurosurgeons when appropriate. Techniques such as endoscopic endonasal surgery are used in pituitary tumors, craniopharyngiomas, chordomas, and the repair of cerebrospinal fluid leaks. Ventricular endoscopy is used in the treatment of intraventricular bleeds, hydrocephalus, colloid cyst and neurocysticercosis. Endonasal endoscopy is at times carried out with neurosurgeons and ENT surgeons working together as a team.

Repair of craniofacial disorders and disturbance of cerebrospinal fluid circulation is done by neurosurgeons who also occasionally team up with maxillofacial and plastic surgeons. Cranioplasty for craniosynostosis is performed by pediatric neurosurgeons with or without plastic surgeons.

=== Functional mapping and intraoperative monitoring ===
Intraoperative neurophysiological monitoring (IONM) is used to detect ischemia or injury to functional pathways during surgery. Common modalities include somatosensory evoked potentials, motor evoked potentials, brainstem auditory evoked responses, and continuous electroencephalography.

When lesions lie near eloquent cortex, surgeons perform additional functional mapping. Direct electrical cortical stimulation, demonstrated experimentally by Gustav Fritsch and Eduard Hitzig in 1870 and adapted for awake craniotomy by Wilder Penfield in the 1930s, remains the reference standard for localizing motor and language areas. Sites at which low-amplitude bipolar stimulation reproducibly disrupts function are spared during resection. The technique requires patient cooperation and can provoke seizures.

An alternative to direct stimulation is to localize function by recording rather than stimulating. While the patient performs language or motor tasks, electrocorticography (ECoG) electrodes placed on the cortex detect task-related increases in high-gamma activity (roughly 70 to 170 Hz), a signal that closely tracks local neuronal firing. Cortical sites engaged by the task can therefore be mapped in near real time without delivering current and without the seizure risk associated with stimulation. Diffusion tensor imaging tractography and functional MRI are commonly registered to neuronavigation systems for trajectory planning, while subcortical stimulation is used during resection to localize corticospinal tract fibers and language-associated white matter.

== Conditions ==
Conditions treated by neurosurgeons include, but are not limited to:

- Meningitis and other central nervous system infections including abscesses
- Spinal disc herniation
- Cervical spinal stenosis and lumbar spinal stenosis
- Hydrocephalus
- Head trauma (brain hemorrhages, skull fractures, etc.)
- Spinal cord trauma
- Traumatic injuries of peripheral nerves
- Tumors of the spine, spinal cord and peripheral nerves
- Intracerebral hemorrhage, such as subarachnoid hemorrhage, interdepartmental, and intracellular hemorrhages
- Some forms of drug-resistant epilepsy
- Some forms of movement disorders (advanced Parkinson's disease, chorea) – this involves the use of specially developed minimally invasive stereotactic techniques (functional, stereotactic neurosurgery) such as ablative surgery and deep brain stimulation surgery
- Intractable pain of cancer or trauma patients and cranial/peripheral nerve pain
- Some forms of intractable psychiatric disorders
- Vascular malformations (i.e., arteriovenous malformations, venous angiomas, cavernous angiomas, capillary telangectasias) of the brain and spinal cord
- Moyamoya disease

== Recovery ==
=== Postoperative pain ===
Pain following brain surgery can be significant and may lengthen recovery, increase the amount of time a person stays in the hospital following surgery, and increase the risk of complications following surgery. Severe acute pain following brain surgery may also increase the risk of a person developing a chronic post-craniotomy headache. Approaches to treating pain in adults include treatment with nonsteroidal anti‐inflammatory drugs (NSAIDs), which have been shown to reduce pain for up to 24 hours following surgery. Low-quality evidence supports the use of the medications dexmedetomidine, pregabalin or gabapentin to reduce post-operative pain. Low-quality evidence also supports scalp blocks and scalp infiltration to reduce postoperative pain. Gabapentin or pregabalin may also decrease vomiting and nausea following surgery, based on very low-quality medical evidence.

== Bioethics in neurosurgery ==
Neurosurgery is a part of practical medicine and the only specialty that involves invasive intervention in the activity of the living brain. The brain ensures the structural and functional integrity of the body and the implementation of all the main life processes of the body. Therefore, neurosurgery faces a wide range of bioethical issues and a significant selection of the latest treatment technologies.

Neurosurgery has the following applied scientific and ethical problems:

- Ethical and legal aspects of clinical research
- Axiological deficit due to professional deformation and professional burnout
- Limited access to expensive medical services
- The industry-specific problem of "medical error" due to the complexity of neurosurgical pathologies and the huge number of possible technologies and tools for their treatment
- Controversial bioethical and legal issues of surgery for the treatment of psychiatric diseases
- Bioethical discussions regarding the instrumentation of reconstructive surgery, through the use of experimental technologies
- Debatable bioethical issues of improving human brain activity with the help of artificial implants, for instance neurocomponents (artificial impulse quasi-neurons)
- Cyborgization in transhumanism meaning
- Ethical issue of standardization of research protocols for testing neuroengineering means of nerve tissue regeneration in order to improve the implementation of experimental research results in clinical practice

== Notable neurosurgeons ==
- Saleem Abdulrauf – developed "awake" craniotomy for complex aneurysms and vascular malformations
- John R. Adler – Stanford University neurosurgeon who invented the Cyberknife
- Alim-Louis Benabid – ne of the developers of deep brain stimulation surgery for movement disorder
- Ben Carson – retired pediatric neurosurgeon from Johns Hopkins Hospital, pioneer in hemispherectomy, and pioneer in the separation of craniopagus twins (joined at the head); former 2016 Republican Party presidential candidate, and former U.S. secretary of Housing and Urban Development under the Presidency of Donald Trump
- Harvey Cushing – one of the founders of modern neurosurgery
- Walter Dandy – one of the founders of modern neurosurgery
- Christopher Duntsch – former neurosurgeon who killed or maimed nearly every patient he operated on before being incarcerated
- Victor Horsley – the first neurosurgeon
- Sofia Ionescu-Ogrezeanu – first woman neurosurgeon As a medical student at the University of Bucharest, she performed her first neurosurgical procedure in 1944, under the supervision of Dumitru Bagdasar, and saved the life of an 8-year old comatose boy with an epidural hematoma (during the WWII bombardment of Bucharest).
- Lars Leksell – Swedish neurosurgeon who developed the gamma knife
- Wirginia Maixner – pediatric neurosurgeon at Melbourne's Royal Children's Hospital, known for separating conjoined Bangladeshi twins Trishna and Krishna
- Henry Marsh – leading English neurosurgeon and pioneer of neurosurgical advancements in Ukraine
- Frank Henderson Mayfield – invented the Mayfield skull clamp
- B. K. Misra – first neurosurgeon in the world to perform image-guided surgery for aneurysms, first in South Asia to perform stereotactic radiosurgery, first in India to perform awake craniotomy and laparoscopic spine surgery
- Karin Muraszko – first woman to occupy a chair of neurosurgery at an American medical school (University of Michigan)
- Juliet Sekabunga Nalwanga – Uganda's first woman neurosurgeon
- Hirotaro Narabayashi – pioneer of stereotactic neurosurgery.
- Ayub K. Ommaya – invented the Ommaya reservoir
- Mohana Rao Patibandla – known for performing India's first invasive brain surgery using the BrainPath system
- Wilder Penfield – one of the founding fathers of modern neurosurgery, and pioneer of epilepsy neurosurgery
- Ludvig Puusepp – one of the founding fathers of modern neurosurgery, world's first professor of neurosurgery
- Robert Wheeler Rand – among the first to introduce the surgical microscope into neurosurgical procedures in 1957 and published first textbook on microneurosurgery in 1969
- Joseph Ransohoff – known for his pioneering use of medical imaging and catheterization in neurosurgery, and for founding the first neurosurgery intensive care unit
- Majid Samii – pioneer of cerebello-pontine angle tumor surgery; World Federation of Neurosurgical Societies coined a medal of honor bearing his name, given to outstanding neurosurgeons every two years
- Hermann Schloffer – invented transsphenoidal surgery in 1907
- Robert J. White – established the Vatican's Commission on Biomedical Ethics in 1981 after his appointment to the Pontifical Academy of Sciences, known for head transplants on living monkeys
- Gazi Yaşargil – "father of microneurosurgery"

== See also ==
- American Association of Neurological Surgeons – Scientific and educational association
- Congress of Neurological Surgeons – Professional organization
- Cranial auscultation – Medical neurological procedure to check for intracranial bruits
- Global neurosurgery – Global health subspecialty
- List of neurologists and neurosurgeons
- Polyaxial screw – Orthopedic screw
