= Status dystonicus =

- Other names: Dystonic storm
- Specialty: Neurology, neurocritical care, emergency medicine
- Symptoms: Prolonged sustained muscle contractions
- Complications: Metabolic derangements, respiratory distress, fractures, dehydration
- Types: Tonic and phasic
- Causes: Primary or secondary dystonias, underlying neurologic disorder
- Risk factors: Infection, medication management, failure of devices, pain, fever, dehydration, constipation
- Differential diagnosis: Status epilepticus, neuroleptic malignant syndrome, malignant hyperthermia, intrathecal baclofen withdrawal
- Medication: Combination of anti-dystonics and sedative agents

Status dystonicus, also referred to as 'dystonic storm,' is the most severe presentation of dystonia and represents an acute neurologic emergency. Dystonia is characterized by muscle contractions that are both persistent and involuntary. Status dystonicus most commonly occurs in pediatric patients with underlying primary or secondary dystonia, though it rarely can be the first manifestation of an underlying neurologic disorder. Currently, there is no standard definition or diagnostic criteria for status dystonicus, but the majority of sources delineate between classic dystonia and status dystonicus by the need for hospitalization and the presence of life-threatening complications.

Management involves identification and treatment of triggers, supportive care for complications, and pharmacologic management with sedatives and dystonia-directed medications. In patients refractory to initial management, surgical therapies may be considered as an alternative long-term treatment. These include deep brain stimulator and bilateral pallidotomy.

== Epidemiology ==
Status dystonicus is most common in children and adolescents, but can also occur in adult populations. Though the exact prevalence is unknown, status dystonicus is considered a rare manifestation of dystonia. It is possible that many cases have gone undiagnosed due to its poorly defined diagnostic criteria and general obscurity. Patients can have dystonia secondary to genetic or acquired etiologies. The most common etiologies include (1) cerebral palsy and (2) GNAO1-encephalopathy. Other pathogenic variants have been identified in the KMT2B, KCNT1, and KCNMA1 genes. Less commonly, status dystonicus can be the first manifestation of an underlying neurologic disorder of metabolic, infectious, and/or inflammatory etiology - including Lesch–Nyhan syndrome, Glutaric aciduria type 1, Pantothenate kinase-associated neurodegeneration, and Encephalitis (both infectious and autoimmune).

== Pathophysiology ==
The pathophysiology of status dystonicus is poorly understood. Dystonia involves pathologic signaling between the cerebellum and basal ganglia, but it is not understood what drives the transition from dystonia to status dystonicus. One study identified excessive pallidal beta-band activity in patients with status dystonicus, though these findings have not yet been replicated in other studies.

== Signs and symptoms ==
The only defining feature of status dystonicus is the presence of diffuse sustained muscle contractions. Patients differ in disease presentation, progression, and responsiveness to treatment. Given the severity of this disorder, patients often have concurrent symptoms from underlying triggers or complications. There are no consistently identified abnormal lab values, but patients often have elevated creatine kinase and/or inflammatory markers.

Status dystonicus can be further classified by the character of the contractions. 'Tonic' status dystonicus is characterized by prolonged contractions, while 'phasic' status dystonicus is characterized by short-lasting repetitive contractions.

== Management ==
Though there is no standard pathway for management of status dystonicus, the majority of reviews recommend following the "ABCD" approach - "address triggers, begin supportive care, calibrate sedation, and administer dystonia-specific medications." This should not be confused with the commonly referenced ABCDE mnemonic which is a generic algorithm for assessing critical organ functionality in an acutely ill patient. It is important to perform the steps of the "ABCD" approach simultaneously and adjust to the patient's needs. Patients that are unresponsive to this initial pathway may require additional stabilizing measures such as prolonged sedation and escalation of dystonia-directed medications and can be considered for surgical therapies.

=== Step 1 - Identify and address triggers ===
Roughly 2/3 of patients that present in status dystonicus have identifiable triggers or precipitants. It is important to identify these by taking a detailed history, performing a thorough physical exam, and ordering relevant blood work. Specific labs are patient and institution specific, but can include CBC, CMP, CK-MB, blood culture, blood gas analysis, urinalysis, and/or urine culture. Once pertinent triggers are identified, it is important to manage these throughout the duration of the patient's stay.

==== Common triggers ====
- Illness
- Medication management
  - Missed doses
  - Non-compliance
  - Dosage changes
  - Addition of new medications
- Failure of devices (Intrathecal baclofen pump and/or deep brain stimulator)
- Pain and/or discomfort
- Fever
- Dehydration
- Constipation

=== Step 2 - Provide supportive care ===
Throughout hospitalization, it is important to continuously measure critical lab values and monitor for secondary complications. Complications occur in approximately 40% of cases and can lead to prolonged hospital stay and/or need for ICU admission. Supportive measures are patient dependent but can include fluid resuscitation, enteral or parenteral nutrition, analgesics, anti-pyretics, and/or optimal positioning.

==== Common complications ====
- Rhabdomyolysis and renal failure
- Respiratory failure
- Gastric bleeding
- Pain
- Fractures
- Fever
- Dehydration

=== Step 3 - Initiate sedation ===
In status dystonicus, sedation is often utilized to minimize the patient's pain and discomfort as well as risk for secondary complications while the underlying trigger is addressed and dystonia medications are fine-tuned to the patient. In general, it is recommended to start with the least sedative agent and escalate per patient needs. First line agents include diphenhydramine followed by diazepam, clonidine, and/or chloral hydrate. If none of these options provide sufficient relief, it is recommended to consider second line agents such as dexmedetomidine and midazolam followed by non-depolarizing paralytics or propofol. Depending on the specific sedative agent, patients may require intubation and/or mechanical ventilation.

=== Step 4 - Administer dystonia-specific medications ===
In status dystonicus, the options for anti-dystonics are broad and patient responses are highly variable. Some of the most commonly cited agents include trihexyphenidyl, pimozide, haloperidol, tetrabenazine, levodopa, baclofen, and gabapentin. Gabapentin has notably been seen to improve status dystonicus in patients with Wilson's disease and may be considered in patients with this underlying disorder. It is important to consider pertinent adverse effects of these drugs when selecting a specific agent and carefully monitor how patients respond to each medication. If patients are unresponsive to these medications, surgical therapies may be considered as an alternative treatment plan.

=== Surgical therapies ===
==== Deep brain stimulation ====
This is a surgical technique in which electrodes are implanted in different areas of the brain, specifically in the globus pallidus internal for patients with status dystonicus. In patients with refractory status dystonicus, it has showed promising results and is considered the most preferable surgical option for patients given its high efficacy, ability to be reversed, and decreased risk of adverse effects compared to other surgical approaches.

==== Bilateral pallidotomy ====
This is a ablative technique in which lesions are made in the bilateral globus pallidi. This technique was popular in the 1950 to 1980s, but was largely replaced by deep brain stimulation. Based on the available data, it represents an alternative approach of comparable efficacy and thus may be considered in patients with status dystonicus, especially those with contraindications to deep brain stimulation.

== Prognosis ==
Mortality is an associated risk of status dystonicus, thus the need for early intervention and careful monitoring of the patient throughout the duration of their hospitalization. Patients with history of status dystonicus are at risk for additional episodes. It is important to partner with the patient and their family to build a patient-specific dystonia action plan to help circumvent episodes in the future. These action plans should be focused on helping patients and their families identify acute changes and provide steps that can be taken at home to help prevent progression of their illness.

== Differential diagnoses ==
- Status epilepticus
- Neuroleptic malignant syndrome
- Malignant hyperthermia
- Intrathecal baclofen withdrawal
