= Russell A. Brown =

American physician and computer scientist

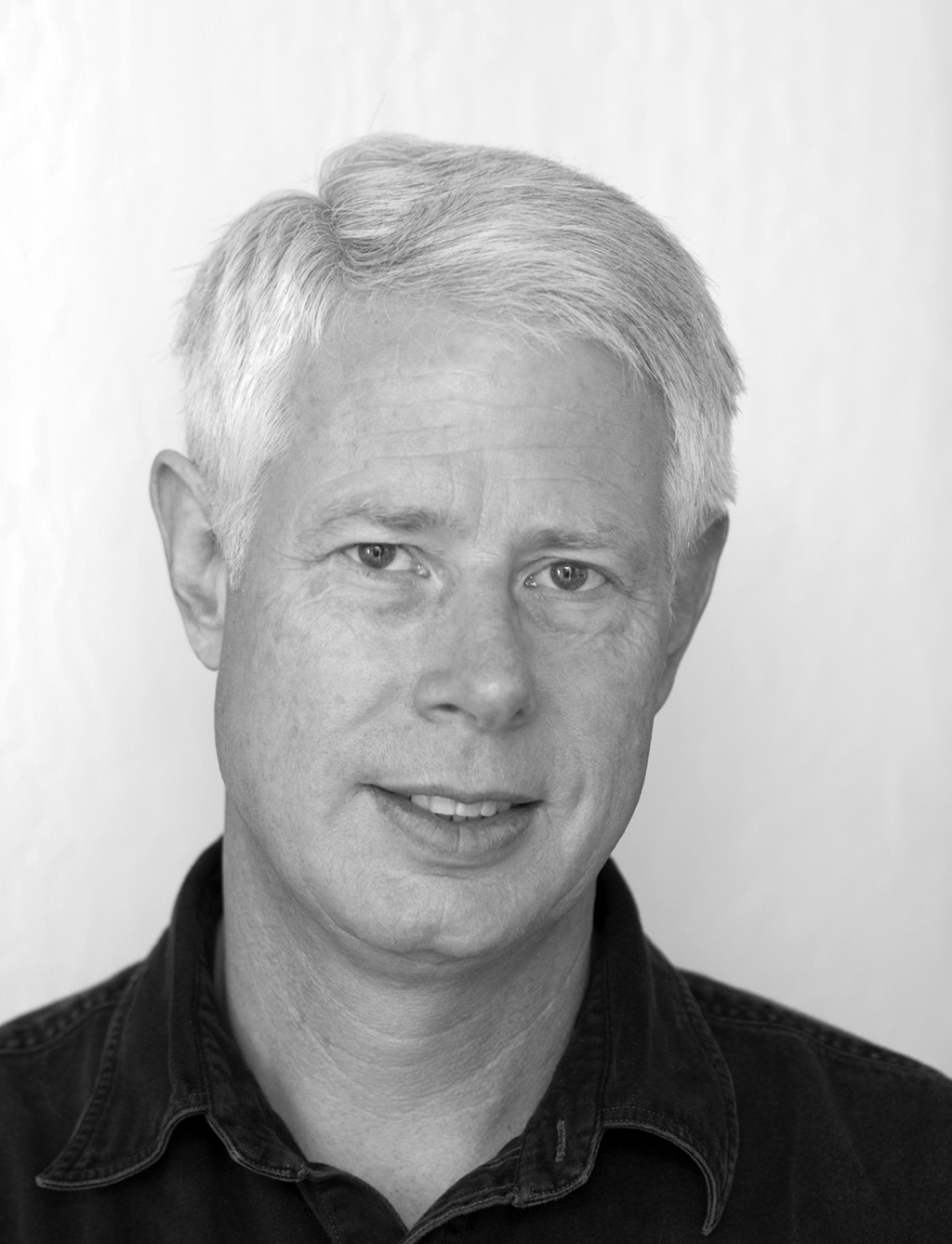
Russell A. Brown in 2007

Russell A. Brown, an American physician and computer scientist, is the inventor of the N-localizer technology that enables guidance of stereotactic surgery or radiosurgery using medical images that are obtained via computed tomography (CT), magnetic resonance imaging (MRI), or positron emission tomography (PET).

Brown invented the N-localizer in 1978 when he was a medical student investigating image-guided surgery in the laboratory of his mentor, James A. Nelson, at the University of Utah. A few months later, Brown designed and built the first CT-compatible stereotactic frame in order to test the concept of the N-localizer.

Brown also made contributions to the k-d tree and to the generalized Born model of implicit solvation.
