= Sofia Ionescu =

World's first female neurosurgeon

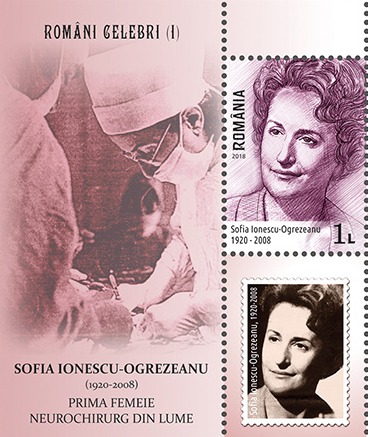
Ionescu on a 2018 stamp sheet of Romania

Sofia Ionescu-Ogrezeanu (25 April 1920 – 21 March 2008) was possibly the first female neurosurgeon in the world.

== Early life ==
Ionescu was born in Fălticeni, Suceava County, daughter of Constantin Ogrezeanu, a bank cashier, and Maria Ogrezeanu, housewife.

Ionescu's interest in medicine began after she met one of her best friends, Aurelia Dumitru, and her father, Dr. Dumitru. The death of one of her school friends, who died in Paris due to an infection after brain surgery, impelled Ionescu to apply to medical school.

== Education ==
She attended high school first in Fălticeni and then in Bucharest. Supported by her mother, she applied to the Faculty of Medicine of Bucharest in 1939. In her first internship year, she studied ophthalmology. Next year, she spent in Suceava at a poorly-equipped clinic during a typhus epidemic. During a school break, she volunteered to take care of Soviet prisoners at Stamate Hospital in Fălticeni. She entered the surgical service of the hospital, doing her first surgical operations, mostly amputations.

In October 1943, she became an intern at Hospital Nr. 9 in Bucharest. In 1944, during the Bombing of Bucharest in World War II, she was forced to perform an emergency brain surgery on an injured boy due to lack of sufficient medical staff. In 1945, she became certified in medicine and surgery.

== Career ==
She was a neurosurgeon for 47 years at Hospital Nr. 9, forming a team with Ionel Ionescu and Constantin Arseni, under the guidance of Dumitru Bagdasar. They formed the first neurological team of Romania, later called "The golden team", which helped develop neurosurgery in Romania.

In 1970, the favorite wife of the Sheikh of Abu Dhabi had become ill. As a man could not enter the harem, they needed to find a female doctor. Ionescu stayed one week at the woman’s side and cured her. As a reward the sheik gave her 2,000 dollars and an expensive piece of jewelry. She died on 21 March 2008 in

== Possible world’s first female neurosurgeon ==
A 2008 profile in Neurosurgery credits Diana Beck as the world's first female neurosurgeon; the claim has also been made for Ionescu, although the author notes that Ionescu only finished medical school in 1945, when Beck was already working as a consultant in neurosurgery. The World Federation of Neurosurgical Societies recognizes Beck as the first British woman neurosurgeon.
