= Saleem Abdulrauf =

American neurosurgeon

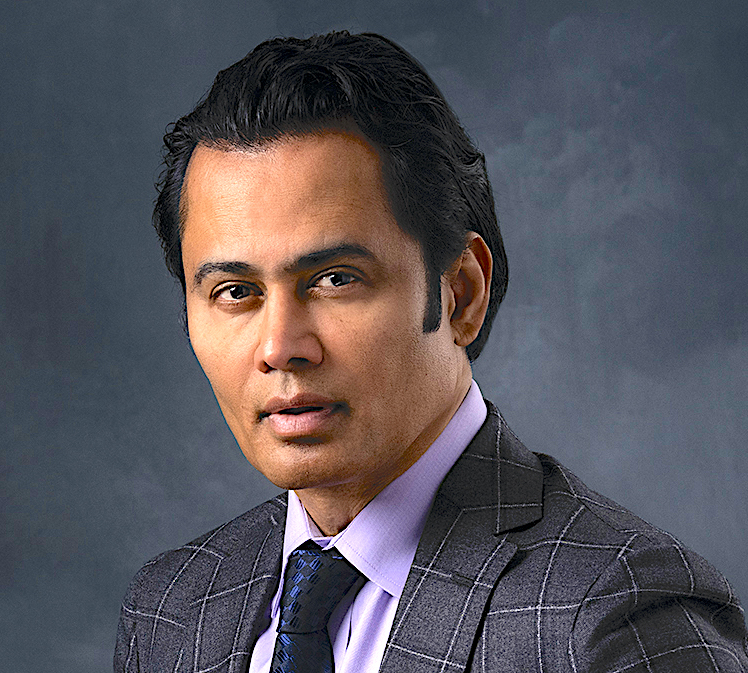
- Education: Washington University in St. Louis
- Years active: 2000–present
- Medical career
- Profession: Physician
- Field: Neurosurgery
- Institutions: Abdulrauf Institute of Neurosurgery
- Sub-specialties: Brain bypass surgery
- Website: https://abdulraufinstitute.org

Saleem Abdulrauf is an American physician specializing in neurosurgery in Washington, DC, who has helped develop high-flow brain bypass surgery, a less invasive procedure for treating intracranial aneurysm than methods used previously.

He is a Professor of Neurosurgery at George Washington University and the Neurosurgeon-in-Chief at the Abdulrauf Institute of Neurosurgery. He is the Founding Professor and Chairman of the Department of Neurological Surgery at Saint Louis University School of Medicine and Director of the Center for Cerebrovascular and Skull Base Surgery at Saint Louis University Hospital in Saint Louis, Missouri.

Abdulrauf has served on the boards of multiple neurosurgical societies, including the Congress of Neurological Surgeons (CNS) and the World Federation of Skull Base Societies (WFSBS).

== Biography ==
Abdulrauf attended a high school in Kansas City, Missouri, and received his Bachelor of Arts in biology from Washington University in St. Louis, Missouri. He attended medical school at Saint Louis University School of Medicine, where he received the M.D. degree. He completed post-graduate training and a residency in neurosurgery at Henry Ford Hospital in Detroit, Michigan and subsequently completed a fellow in Cerebrovascular Neurosurgery at Yale University, where he was on faculty in the Department of Neurosurgery. Abdulrauf completed a fellowship in skull base neurosurgery at the University of Arkansas School of Medicine in Little Rock, Arkansas, training under M. Gazi Yasargil, who developed brain bypass surgery in the 1960s in Switzerland and is considered the father of modern neurosurgery.

Abdulrauf has played a role in the development and education of a new brain bypass technique, now known as the Abdulrauf bypass. In 2010 Abdulrauf performed the first high-flow bypass operation on a giant brain aneurysm in a blood vessel at the base of the skull of a 51-year-old woman. This less-invasive technique, which requires a much smaller incision, promotes better blood flow and reduces recovery time, was a significant advancement in neurosurgery; it was a cover article in the medical journal Neurosurgery in March 2010. In collaboration with Scanlan International, Abdulrauf also developed the neurosurgical instrument to accommodate the requirements of the Abdulrauf bypass technique.

== Selected publications ==
Abdulrauf wrote a reference textbook for bypass brain surgery titled Cerebral Revascularization: Techniques in Extracranial-to-Intracranial Bypass Surgery: Expert Consult, and is an editor on the third edition of Principles of Neurosurgery. Publications include:

1. Ellenbogen, Richard G.; Abdulrauf, Saleem I.; Sekhar, Laligam N. (2012). Principles of neurological surgery (3rd ed.). Philadelphia, PA: Saunders/Elsevier. ISBN 978-1-4377-0701-4.
2. Abdulrauf, Saleem I. (2011). Cerebral revascularization: techniques in extracranial-to-intracranial bypass surgery. Philadelphia, PA: Elsevier Saunders. ISBN 978-1-4377-1785-3.
3. Abdulrauf, Saleem I (2005). "Extracranial-to-Intracranial Bypass Using Radial Artery Grafting for Complex Skull Base Tumors: Technical Note". Skull Base (in German). 15 (03): 207–213. doi:10.1055/s-2005-872596. ISSN 1531-5010. PMC 1214706. PMID 16175230.
4. Yaşargil, M. Gazi; Abdulrauf, Saleem I. (2008). "Surgery of Intraventricular Tumors". Neurosurgery. 62 (6): SHC1029–SHC1041. doi:10.1227/01.NEU.0000316427.57165.01. ISSN 0148-396X.
5. Coppens, Jeroen R.; Cantando, John D.; Abdulrauf, Saleem I. (2008). "Minimally invasive superficial temporal artery to middle cerebral artery bypass through an enlarged bur hole: the use of computed tomography angiography neuronavigation in surgical planning: Technical note". Journal of Neurosurgery. 109 (3): 553–558. doi:10.3171/JNS/2008/109/9/0553. ISSN 0022-3085.
6. Mahaney, Kelly B.; Abdulrauf, Saleem I. (2008). "Anatomic Relationship of the Optic Radiations to the Atrium of the Lateral Ventricle". Operative Neurosurgery. 63 (4): 195–203. doi:10.1227/01.NEU.0000313121.58694.4A. ISSN 2332-4252.
7. Abdulrauf, Saleem I; Sweeney, Justin M; Mohan, Yedathore S; Palejwala, Sheri K (2011). "Short Segment Internal Maxillary Artery to Middle Cerebral Artery Bypass: A Novel Technique for Extracranial-to-Intracranial Bypass". Neurosurgery. 68 (3): 804–809. doi:10.1227/NEU.0b013e3182093355. ISSN 0148-396X.
