= Hirotaro Narabayashi =

Hirotaro Narabayashi (楢林博太郎, Narabayashi Hirotaro; 1922.09.04 – 2001.03.18) was a prominent Japanese neurosurgeon.

He was born in Kobe into a long line of physicians originally from Nagasaki. He was a descendant of Chinzan Narabayashi who had studied Western medicine with Dutch physicians at Dejima in the 17th century. He received his medical degree from the Tokyo University School of Medicine in 1946 and his Ph.D. from Tokyo University in 1955. In the same year, he was appointed Associate Professor, Department of Neuropsychiatry, at the Juntendo University School of Medicine in Tokyo. He was promoted to Full Professor in 1964. From 1968 to 1988, he was Professor and Chairman of the Department of Neurology at the Juntendo University School of Medicine.

Although trained originally as a neuropsychiatrist, he is best known for his pioneering work in stereotactic surgery, especially the surgical treatment of Parkinson's disease. In 1949 he constructed a stereotaxic apparatus based on drawings of that constructed in the United States by Victor Horsley and Robert H. Clarke and in 1951 performed the first stereotactic pallidotomy on an athetoid child. The next year he performed a procaine oil blocking of the pallidum of a patient with Parkinson's disease, successfully abolishing the rigidity and tremor symptomatic of this disease.

In 1957 he established a private clinic specializing in stereotaxic neurosurgery which became a leading center for both research and treatment. Physicians came to visit from all over the world, and patients came for treatment from many countries.

Narabayashi was known for his humility, modest manner, and sympathetic attitude toward students and junior physicians.

Dr. Narabayashi lectured all over the world, but perhaps his most memorable trip was to Cuba in 1974 at the invitation of the Cuban Institute of Neuroscience. To his surprise, he was summoned to meet Fidel Castro who was quite interested in medicine. Castro presented him with a box of Cuban cigars on the bands of which was printed "To Hiro from Fidel".

He died, not having recovered from the loss of his wife 5 months previously, and was buried in the family cemetery in Nagasaki. He left three grown children, the youngest, Yosuke, also a physician, and a distinguished legacy.
