= Stereotactic surgery =

Medical procedure

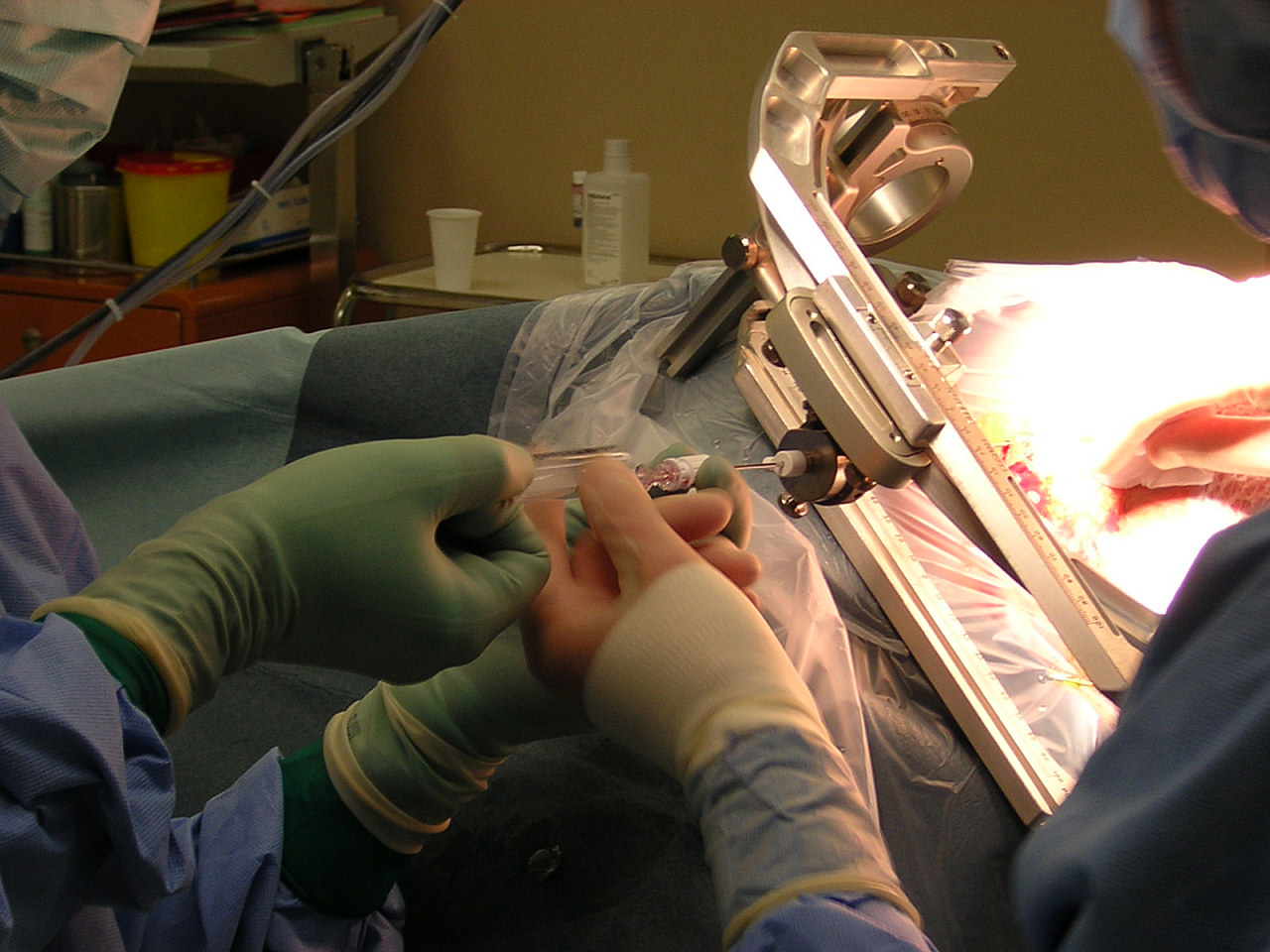
- Brain biopsy using a needle mounted on a stereotactic instrument
- Other names: Stereotaxy
- Specialty: Neurosurgery

Stereotactic surgery is a minimally invasive form of surgical intervention that makes use of a three-dimensional coordinate system to locate small targets inside the body and to perform on them some action such as ablation, biopsy, lesion, injection, stimulation, implantation, radiosurgery (SRS), etc.

In theory, any organ system inside the body can be subjected to stereotactic surgery. However, difficulties in setting up a reliable frame of reference (such as bone landmarks, which bear a constant spatial relation to soft tissues) mean that its applications have been, traditionally and until recently, limited to brain surgery. Besides the brain, biopsy and surgery of the breast are done routinely to locate, sample (biopsy), and remove tissue. Plain X-ray images (radiographic mammography), computed tomography, and magnetic resonance imaging (MRI) can be used to guide the procedure.

Another accepted form of "stereotactic" is "stereotaxic". The word roots are stereo-, a prefix derived from the Greek word στερεός (stereos, "solid"), and -taxis (a suffix of Neo-Latin and ISV, derived from Greek taxis, "arrangement", "order", from tassein, "to arrange").

== Uses ==
Stereotactic surgery is used to treat various brain cancers, benign, and functional disorders of the brain. This surgery is sometimes combined with whole brain radiotherapy for brain metastasis. A 2021 systematic review from the Agency for Healthcare Research and Quality found no statistically significant difference in overall survival for stereotactic radiosurgery in combination with whole brain radiotherapy compared to either treatment alone.

Amongst the malignant brain disorders are: brain metastasis and glioblastoma. The benign brain disorders are: meningioma, cerebral arteriovenous malformation, vestibular schwannoma, and pituitary adenoma. Functional disorders are: trigeminal neuralgia, Parkinson's disease, and epilepsy.

== Procedure ==
Stereotactic surgery works on the basis of three main components:

- A stereotactic planning system, including atlas, multimodality image matching tools, coordinates calculator, etc.
- A stereotactic device or apparatus
- A stereotactic localization and placement procedure

Modern stereotactic planning systems are computer based. The stereotactic atlas is a series of cross sections of anatomical structure (for example, a human brain), depicted in reference to a two-coordinate frame. Thus, each brain structure can be easily assigned a range of three coordinate numbers, which will be used for positioning the stereotactic device. In most atlases, the three dimensions are: latero-lateral (x), dorso-ventral (y) and rostro-caudal (z).

The stereotactic apparatus uses a set of three coordinates (x, y and z) in an orthogonal frame of reference (cartesian coordinates), or, alternatively, a cylindrical coordinates system, also with three coordinates: angle, depth and antero-posterior (or axial) location. The mechanical device has head-holding clamps and bars which puts the head in a fixed position in reference to the coordinate system (the so-called zero or origin). In small laboratory animals, these are usually bone landmarks which are known to bear a constant spatial relation to soft tissue. For example, brain atlases often use the external auditory meatus, the inferior orbital ridges, the median point of the maxilla between the incisive teeth. or the bregma (confluence of sutures of frontal and parietal bones), as such landmarks. In humans, the reference points, as described above, are intracerebral structures which are clearly discernible in a radiograph or tomograph. In newborn human babies, the "soft spot" where the coronal suture and sagittal suture meet (known as the anterior fontanelle) becomes the bregma when this gap closes(usually between 7-18 months).

Guide bars in the x, y and z directions (or alternatively, in the polar coordinate holder), fitted with high precision vernier scales allow the neurosurgeon to position the point of a probe (an electrode, a cannula, etc.) inside the brain, at the calculated coordinates for the desired structure, through a small trephined hole in the skull.

Currently, a number of manufacturers produce stereotactic devices fitted for neurosurgery in humans, for both brain and spine procedures, as well as for animal experimentation.

=== Types frame systems ===
1. Simple orthogonal system: The probe is directed perpendicular to a square base unit fixed to the skull. These provide three degrees of freedom by means of a carriage that moved orthogonally along the base plate or along a bar attached parallel to the base plate of the instrument. Attached to the carriage was a second track that extended across the head frame perpendicularly.
2. Burr hole mounted system: This provides a limited range of possible intracranial target points with a fixed entry point. They provided two angular degrees of freedom and a depth adjustment. The surgeon could place the burr hole over nonessential brain tissue and utilize the instrument to direct the probe to the target point from the fixed entry point at the burr hole.
3. Arc-quadrant systems: Probes are directed perpendicular to the tangent of an arc (which rotates about the vertical axis) and a quadrant (which rotates about the horizontal axis). The probe, directed to a depth equal to the radius of the sphere defined by the arc-quadrant, will always arrive at the center or focal point of that sphere.
4. Arc-phantom systems: An aiming bow attaches to the head ring, which is fixed to the patient's skull, and can be transferred to a similar ring that contains a simulated target. In this system, the phantom target is moved on the simulator to 3D coordinates. After adjusting the probe holder on the aiming bow so that the probe touches the desired target on the phantom, the transferable aiming bow is moved from the phantom base ring to the base ring on the patient. The probe is then lowered to the determined depth in order to reach the target point deep in the patient's brain.

== Treatment ==
=== Stereotactic radiosurgery ===
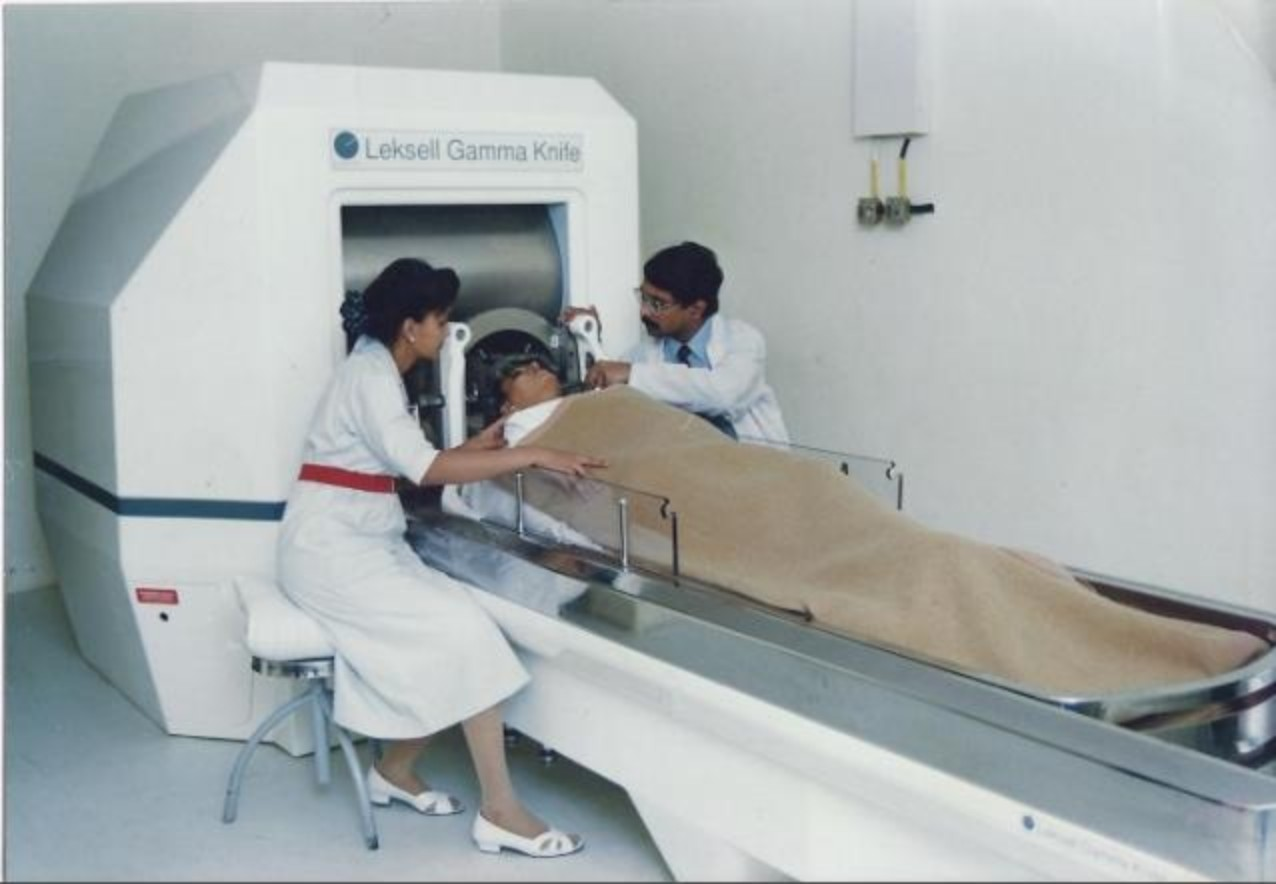
A doctor performing Gamma Knife Radiosurgery

Stereotactic radiosurgery utilizes externally generated ionizing radiation to inactivate or eradicate defined targets in the head or spine without the need to make an incision. This concept requires steep dose gradients to reduce injury to adjacent normal tissue while maintaining treatment efficacy in the target. As a consequence of this definition, the overall treatment accuracy should match the treatment planning margins of 1–2 mm or better. To use this paradigm optimally and treat patients with the highest possible accuracy and precision, all errors, from image acquisition over treatment planning to mechanical aspects of the delivery of treatment and intra-fraction motion concerns, must be systematically optimized. To assure quality of patient care the procedure involves a multidisciplinary team consisting of a radiation oncologist, medical physicist, and radiation therapist. Dedicated, commercially available stereotactic radiosurgery programs are provided by the irrespective Gamma Knife, CyberKnife, and Novalis Radiosurgery devices.

Stereotactic radiosurgery provides minimal invasive treatment alternative for patients diagnosed with malignant, benign and functional indications in the brain and spine, including but not limited to both primary and secondary tumors. Stereotactic radiosurgery is a well-described management option for most metastases, meningiomas, schwannomas, pituitary adenomas, arteriovenous malformations, and trigeminal neuralgia, among others.

Irrespective of the similarities between the concepts of stereotactic radiosurgery and fractionated radiotherapy and although both treatment modalities are reported to have identical outcomes for certain indications, the intent of both approaches is fundamentally different. The aim of stereotactic radiosurgery is to destroy target tissue while preserving adjacent normal tissue, where fractionated radiotherapy relies on a different sensitivity of the target and the surrounding normal tissue to the total accumulated radiation dose. Historically, the field of fractionated radiotherapy evolved from the original concept of stereotactic radiosurgery following discovery of the principles of radiobiology: repair, reassortment, repopulation, and reoxygenation. Today, both treatment techniques are complementary as tumors that may be resistant to fractionated radiotherapy may respond well to radiosurgery and tumors that are too large or too close to critical organs for safe radiosurgery may be suitable candidates for fractionated radiotherapy.

A second, more recent evolution extrapolates the original concept of stereotactic radiosurgery to extra-cranial targets, most notably in the lung, liver, pancreas, and prostate. This treatment approach, entitled stereotactic body radiotherapy or SBRT, is challenged by various types of motion. On top of patient immobilization challenges and the associated patient motion, extra-cranial lesions move with respect to the patient's position due to respiration, bladder and rectum filling. Like stereotactic radiosurgery, the intent of stereotactic body radiotherapy is to eradicate a defined extra-cranial target. However, target motion requires larger treatment margins around the target to compensate for the positioning uncertainty. This in turn implies more normal tissue exposed to high doses, which could result in negative treatment side effects. As a consequence, stereotactic body radiotherapy is mostly delivered in a limited number of fractions, thereby blending the concept of stereotactic radiosurgery with the therapeutic benefits of fractionated radiotherapy. To monitor and correct target motion for accurate and precise patient positioning prior and during treatment, advanced image-guided technologies are commercially available and included in the radiosurgery programs offered by the CyberKnife and Novalis communities.

=== Parkinson's disease ===
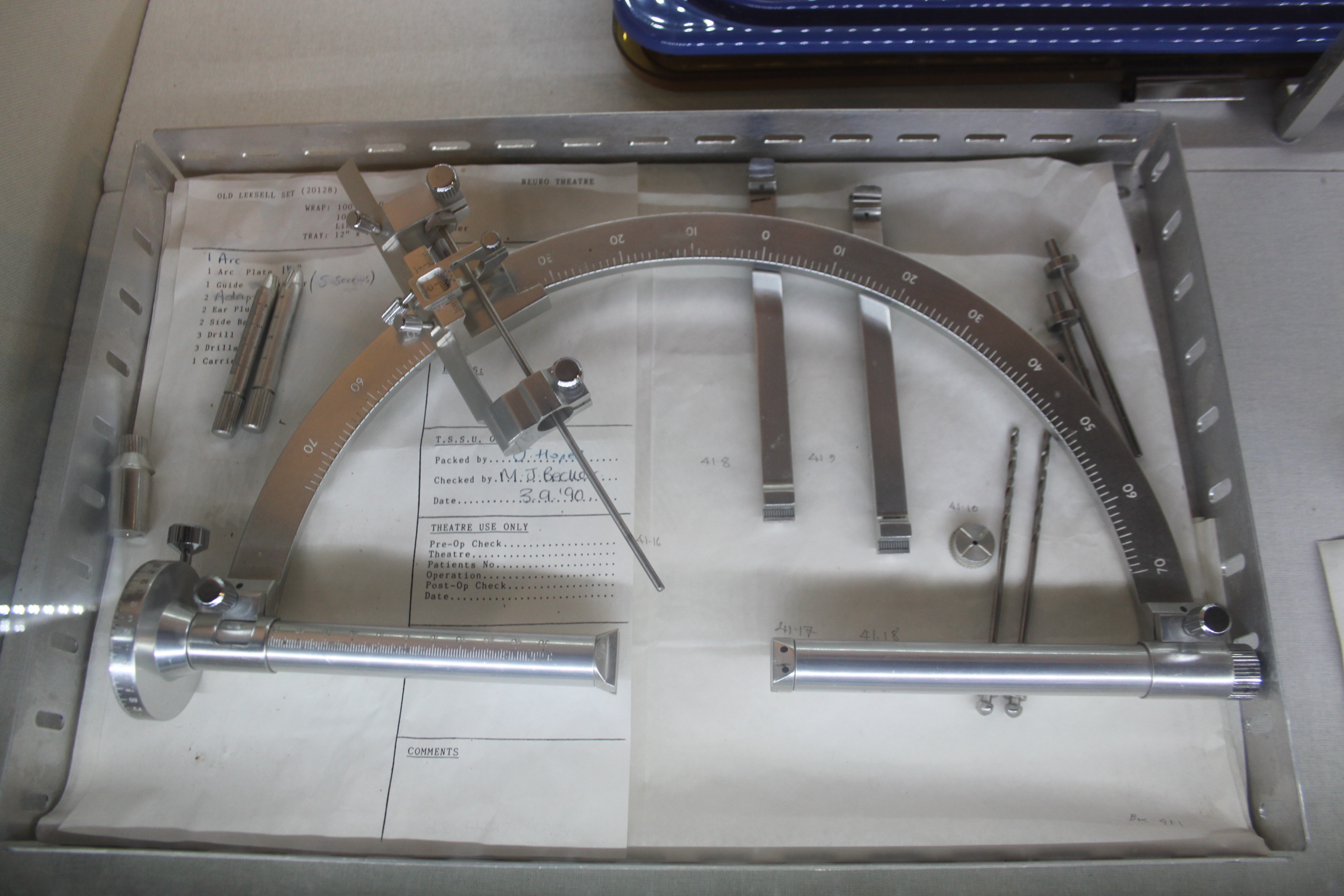
Frame for Stereotactic Thalamotomy on display at the Glenside Museum

Functional neurosurgery comprises treatment of several disorders such as Parkinson's disease, hyperkinesia, disorder of muscle tone, intractable pain, convulsive disorders and psychological phenomena. Treatment for these phenomena was believed to be located in the superficial parts of the CNS and PNS. Most of the interventions made for treatment consisted of cortical extirpation. To alleviate extra pyramidal disorders, pioneer Russell Meyers dissected or transected the head of the caudate nucleus in 1939, and part of the putamen and globus pallidus. Attempts to abolish intractable pain were made with success by transection of the spinothalamic tract at spinal medullary level and further proximally, even at mesencephalic levels.

In 1939–1941 Putnam and Oliver tried to improve Parkinsonism and hyperkinesias by trying a series of modifications of the lateral and antero-lateral cordotomies. Additionally, other scientists like Schurman, Walker, and Guiot made significant contributions to functional neurosurgery. In 1953, Cooper discovered by chance that ligation of the anterior chorioidal artery resulted in improvement of Parkinson's disease. Similarly, when Grood was performing an operation in a patient with Parkinson's, he accidentally lesioned the thalamus. This caused the patient's tremors to stop. From then on, thalamic lesions became the target point with more satisfactory results.

More recent clinical applications can be seen in surgeries used to treat Parkinson's disease, such as Pallidotomy or Thalamotomy (lesioning procedures), or Deep Brain Stimulation (DBS). During DBS, an electrode is placed into the thalamus, the pallidum of the subthalmamic nucleus, parts of brain that are involved in motor control, and are affected by Parkinson's disease. The electrode is connected to a small battery operated stimulator that is placed under the collarbone, where a wire runs beneath the skin to connect it to the electrode in the brain. The stimulator produces electrical impulses that affect the nerve cells around the electrode and should help alleviate tremors or symptoms that are associated with the affected area.

In Thalamotomy, a needle electrode is placed into the thalamus, and the patient must cooperate with tasks assigned to find the affected area- after this area of the thalamus is located, a small high frequency current is applied to the electrode and this destroys a small part of the thalamus. Approximately 90% of patients experience instantaneous tremor relief.

In Pallidotomy, an almost identical procedure to thalamotomy, a small part of the pallidum is destroyed and 80% of patients see improvement in rigidity and hypokinesia and a tremor relief or improvement comes weeks after the procedure.

== History ==
The stereotactic method was first published in 1908 by two British scientists, Victor Horsley, a physician and neurosurgeon, and Robert H. Clarke, a physiologist, and was built by Swift & Son; the two scientists stopped collaborating after the 1908 publication. The Horsley–Clarke apparatus used a Cartesian (three-orthogonal axis) system. That device is in the Science Museum, London; a copy was brought to the US by Ernest Sachs and is in the Department of Neurosurgery at UCLA. Clarke used the original to do research that led to publications of primate and cat brain atlases. There is no evidence it was ever used in a human surgery. The first stereotactic device designed for the human brain appears to have been an adaptation of the Horseley–Clarke frame built at Aubrey T. Mussen's behest by a London workshop in 1918, but it received little attention and does not appear to have been used on people. It was a frame made of brass.

The first stereotactic device used in humans was used by Martin Kirschner, for a method to treat trigeminal neuralgia by inserting an electrode into the trigeminal nerve and ablating it. He published this in 1933.

In 1947 and 1949, two neurosurgeons working at Temple University in Philadelphia, Ernest A. Spiegel (who had fled Austria when the Nazis took over) and Henry T. Wycis, published their work on a device similar to the Horsley–Clarke apparatus in using a cartesian system; it was attached to the patient's head with a plaster cast instead of screws. Their device was the first to be used for brain surgery; they used it for psychosurgery. They also created the first atlas of the human brain, and used intracranial reference points, generated by using medical images acquired with contrast agents.

The work of Spiegel and Wycis sparked enormous interest and research. In Paris, Jean Talairach collaborated with Marcel David, Henri Hacaen, and Julian de Ajuriaguerra on a stereotactic device, publishing their first work in 1949 and eventually developing the Talairach coordinates. In Japan, Hirotaro Narabayashi was doing similar work.

In 1949, Lars Leksell published a device that used polar coordinates instead of cartesian, and two years later he published work where he used his device to target a beam of radiation into a brain. Leksell's radiosurgery system is also used by the Gamma Knife device, and by other neurosurgeons, using linear accelerators, proton beam therapy and neutron capture therapy. Lars Leksell went on to commercialize his inventions by founding Elekta in 1972.

In 1979, Russell A. Brown proposed a device, now known as the N-localizer, that enables guidance of stereotactic surgery using tomographic images that are obtained via medical imaging technologies such as X-ray computed tomography (CT), magnetic resonance imaging (MRI), or positron emission tomography (PET). The N-localizer comprises a diagonal rod that spans two vertical rods to form an N-shape that allows tomographic images to be mapped to physical space. This device became almost universally adopted by the 1980s and is included in the Brown-Roberts-Wells (BRW), Kelly-Goerss, Leksell, Cosman-Roberts-Wells (CRW), Micromar-ETM03B, FiMe-BlueFrame, Macom, and Adeor-Zeppelin stereotactic frames and in the Gamma Knife radiosurgery system. An alternative to the N-localizer is the Sturm-Pastyr localizer that is included in the Riechert-Mundinger and Zamorano-Dujovny stereotactic frames.

Other localization methods also exist that do not make use of tomographic images produced by CT, MRI, or PET, but instead conventional radiographs.

The stereotactic method has continued to evolve, and at present employs an elaborate mixture of image-guided surgery that uses computed tomography, magnetic resonance imaging and stereotactic localization.

== History in Latin America ==
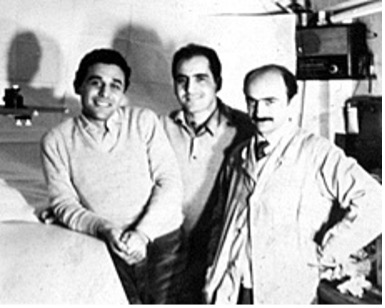
Jorge Candia, Antonio Martos and Jorge Olivetti

In 1970, in the city of Buenos Aires, Argentina, Aparatos Especiales company, produced the first Stereotactic System in Latin America. Antonio Martos Calvo, together with Jorge Candia and Jorge Olivetti through the request of neurosurgeon Jorge Schvarc (1942–2019), developed an equipment based on the principle of Hitchcock Stereotactic System. The patient was seated in an adapted chair with two telescopic arms attached at it base, which fixed the stereotactic frame preventing the patient's movement.

A double radiopaque ruler attached to the side of the frame made it possible to obtain the antero-posterior and latero-lateral X-ray images without the need of moving the radiopaque ruler. The thermal coagulation lesion was performed using tungsten monopole electrodes of 1,5mm of diameter (without temperature control) with a 3mm active tip, utilizing an electrical bipolar coagulator. The lesion size was previously determined by testing the electrode in egg albumin. Coagulation size was the result of the electrical coagulator power regulation and the application time of the radiofrequency. The first surgery performed with this system was a Trigeminal Nucleotractothomy. Jorge Schvarcz performed more than 700 functional surgeries until 1994 when, due to health problems he stopped exercising his profession. But the equipment developed kept improving on a neurosurgery history.

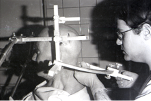
The first surgery performed with Latin-American system was a Trigeminal Nucleotractothomy, performed by Jorge Schvartz.

This was the beginning of the developing of technology to produce stereotactic devices in Latin America. This was the beginning of the first stereotactic manufacturer of Latin America – The Brazilian Micromar.

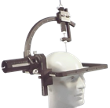

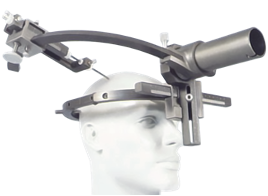

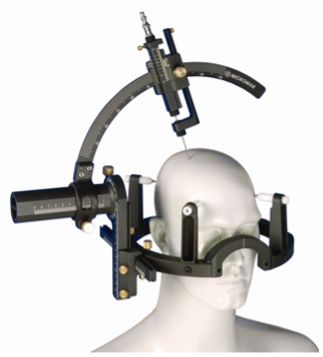

== Research ==
Stereotactic surgery is sometimes used to aid in several different types of animal research studies. Specifically, it is used to target specific sites of the brain and directly introduce pharmacological agents to the brain which otherwise may not be able to cross the blood–brain barrier. In rodents, the main applications of stereotactic surgery are to introduce fluids directly to the brain or to implant cannulae and microdialysis probes. Site specific central microinjections are used when rodents do not need to be awake and behaving or when the substance to be injected has a long duration of action. For protocols in which rodents' behaviors must be assessed soon after injection, stereotactic surgery can be used to implant a cannula through which the animal can be injected after recovery from the surgery. These protocols take longer than site-specific central injections in anesthetized mice because they require the construction of cannulae, wire plugs, and injection needles, but induce less stress in the animals because they allow for a recovery period for the healing of trauma induced to the brain before injection. Surgery can also be used for microdialysis protocols to implant and tether the dialysis probe and guide cannula.

== See also ==
- Radiosurgery
- CyberKnife
- Gamma knife
- Novalis radiosurgery
- Interventional radiology
- Psychosurgery
- Stereotaxis
