= Cranial auscultation =

Medical neurological procedure to check for intracranial bruits

- Purpose: intracranial bruits

Auscultation, a medical neurological procedure, can be performed upon the skull to check for intracranial bruits. Such a bruit may be found in such conditions as cerebral angioma, tumour of the glomus jugulare, intracranial aneurysm, meningioma, occlusion of the internal carotid artery, or increased intracranial pressure.

== Clinical observations ==
The following extract details a method of performing cranial auscultation:

A bruit should be listened for, in quiet surroundings, over the skull and eyeballs, the latter situation being the most favourable for hearing the softest ones. The patient should be asked to close both eyes gently and the stethoscope firmly applied over one eye. During auscultation the other eye should be opened as in this way there is considerable diminution of eyelid flutter, which may cause confusion if rhythmical. Auscultation is then carried out over the other eye in a similar manner. If a murmur is not readily heard the patient should be asked to hold his breath. Finally auscultation should be carried out over the temporal fossæ and mastoid processes.
