= Stereotaxis (company) =

American health care company

Stereotaxis Inc.
- Company type: Public
- Traded as: AMEX: STXS
- Industry: Medical appliances and equipment
- Headquarters: St. Louis
- Key people: David L. Fischel (CEO)
- Products: Robotic Magnetic Navigation Systems; Genesis RMN System; GenesisX RMN; MAGiC; EMAGIN; Map-iT
- Website: www.stereotaxis.com

Stereotaxis Inc. is an American publicly traded medical technology company based in St. Louis, Missouri, that makes robotic systems used by physicians to perform minimally-invasive endovascular procedures, including electrophysiology studies and cardiac catheter ablation procedures.

== Products ==
The Niobe Magnetic Navigation System includes two pods that use permanent magnets mounted on pivoting arms and positioned on opposing sides of the operating table. The magnets are controlled by physicians from the outside using a mouse, keyboard, joystick, and a viewing screen. The rotation of the magnets within the Niobe pods influences the magnetic catheters in the heart to make micro movements of the catheter tip (in increments of 1 mm to 9 mm) to navigate throughout the four chambers of the heart.

The RMN system was originally designed for applications within the brain; its current usage is guiding magnetic catheters during electrophysiology studies and catheter ablation procedures to treat arrhythmias in the heart. It has been used in over 100,000 procedures worldwide as of 2017. In January 2022, Stereotaxis announced that the Fuwai Central China Cardiovascular Hospital became the first in central China to establish a robotic electrophysiology program with the product. In January 2025, Stereotaxis announced the first order for its GenesisX endovascular surgical robotics system and announced European CE mark approval of its proprietary robotically-navigated magnetic ablation catheter. In March 2025, Stereotaxis filed for FDA approval of a magnetically navigated endovascular guide-catheter and a magnetically navigated high density mapping catheter. In July 2025 that magnetic mapping catheter received FDA approval. In November 2025 Stereotaxis' GenesisX endovascular surgical robotics system was approved by the FDA. In January 2026 Stereotaxis' proprietary robotically-navigated magnetic ablation catheter was approved by the FDA.
