= B. K. Misra =

Indian Neurosurgeon

Dr. Basant Kumar Misra
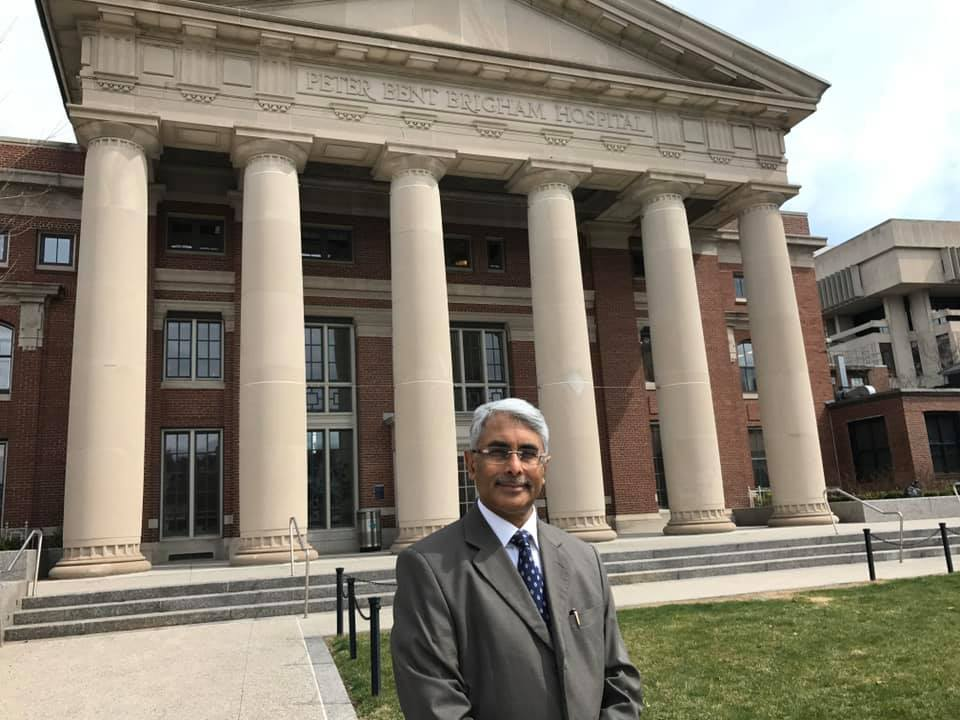
- Dr. Misra at Harvard University
- Born: 18 January 1953 (age 73); Bhubaneswar, Odisha, India
- Education: MBBS, MS, MCh, DrNB, PDC
- Alma mater: VSS Medical College; All India Institute of Medical Sciences, Delhi; University of Edinburgh
- Occupation: Neurosurgeon
- Organization(s): Indian Council of Medical Research, Delhi; Hinduja Hospitals, Mumbai
- Known for: Pioneering image-guided aneurysm surgery, stereotactic radiosurgery, EC-IC bypass, awake craniotomy and endoscopic spinal surgery.
- Awards: Dr. B. C. Roy Award

Dr. Basant Kumar Misra is a neurosurgeon specialising in treating brain, spine, cerebrovascular and peripheral nervous system disorders, injuries, pathologies and malformations. Presently, he is the Honorary President of the World Federation of Neurosurgical Societies, and the Asian Australasian Society of Neurological Surgeons. He is the first neurosurgeon in the world to perform image-guided surgery for aneurysms. He is a recipient of Dr. B. C. Roy Award, the highest medical honour in India.

Previously, he served as the Vice-President of the World Federation of Neurosurgical Societies, and the President of the Asian Australasian Society of Neurological Surgeons, and the Neurological Society of India, and the Chairman of WFNS Foundation.

== Early life and education ==
Basant Misra was born in Bhubaneswar to eminent economist, Dr. Baidyanath Misra and Mrs. Basanti Misra, a homemaker. He did his schooling from the Demonstration Multipurpose School, Bhubaneswar, MBBS from the Government Medical College, Sambalpur, his MS General Surgery from Delhi University, his MCh in Neurosurgery from AIIMS, New Delhi and DrNB Neurosurgery from the National Board of Examinations. He received Commonwealth Medical Scholarship to the University of Edinburgh Medical School.

== Career ==
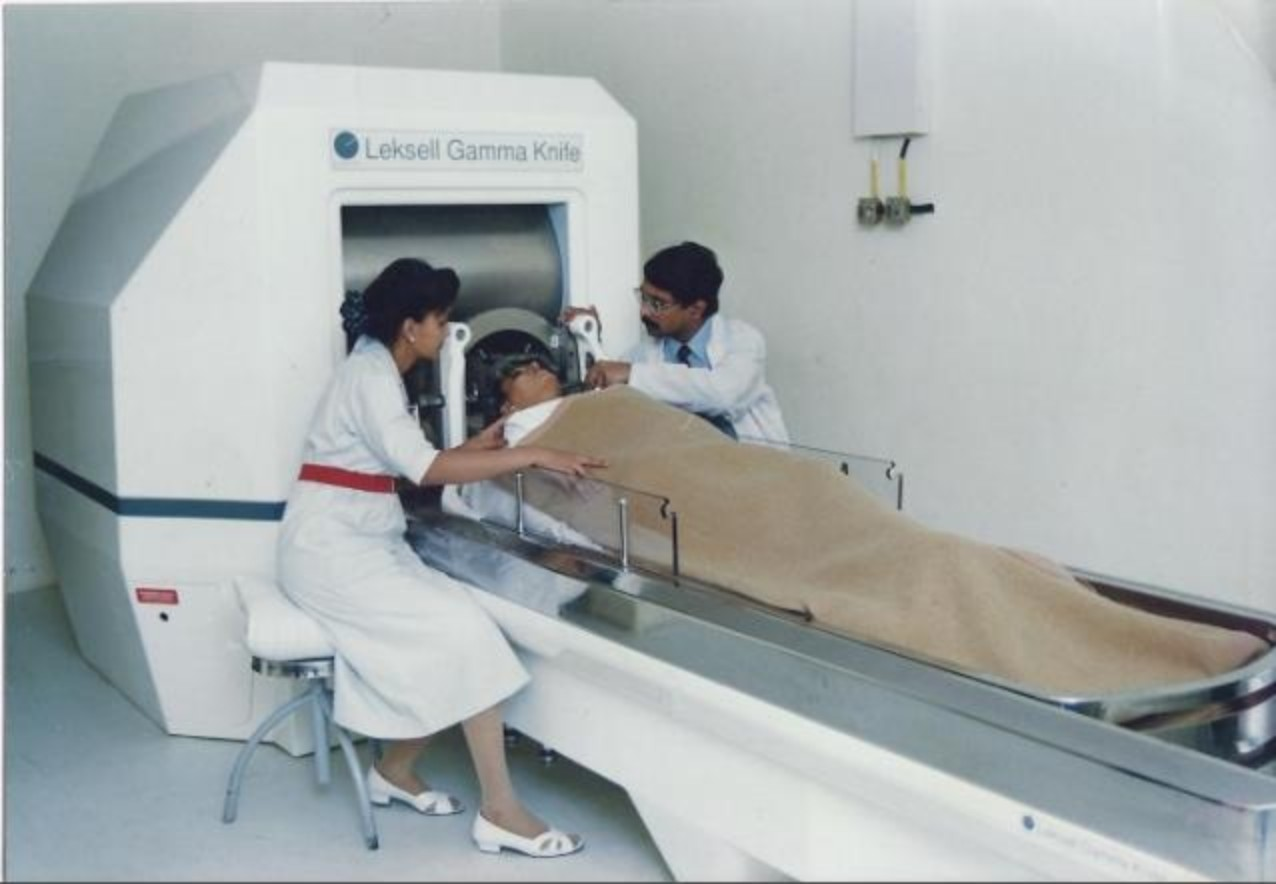
Dr. Misra performing Stereotactic Gamma Knife Radiosurgery, the first time in South Asia

He started his career as a Research officer at the Indian Council of Medical Research, and is currently the Chairman & Chief of Surgery, and Head of the Neurosurgery department at Hinduja Hospitals, Mumbai.

His notable patients include Hrithik Roshan, Salman Khan, Abhijat Joshi, Anand Kumar, among others

- He is the first neurosurgeon in the world to perform image-guided surgery for aneurysms.
- He is the first neurosurgeon in South Asia to perform gamma knife radiosurgery.
- He is the first neurosurgeon in India to perform EC-IC bypass for Moyamoya disease.
- He is the first neurosurgeon in India to perform endoscopic spinal surgery.
- He is the first neurosurgeon in India to perform awake craniotomy.

He is also working with Dr. B. Ravi, institute chair professor of Mechanical engineering and the founder of Biomedical Engineering and Technology (incubation) Centre (BETiC) at IIT Bombay, to co-develop biomedical devices.

He has authored and co-authored more than 200 publications in peer-reviewed national and international journals.

He started the 6-year DrNB course in Neurosurgery for MBBS graduates (one of the only 32 NBE-accredited tertiary-care institutions in India) and a 3-month fellowship programme (one of only 23 WFNS-accredited Class-1 postgraduate training centres in the world) at Hinduja Hospital. He also conducts cadaveric demonstrations, hands-on dissection workshops, seminars and CME courses. He has previously taught at SCTIMST (an Institute of National Importance), Australian School of Advanced Medicine and Harvard Medical School.

== Posts ==
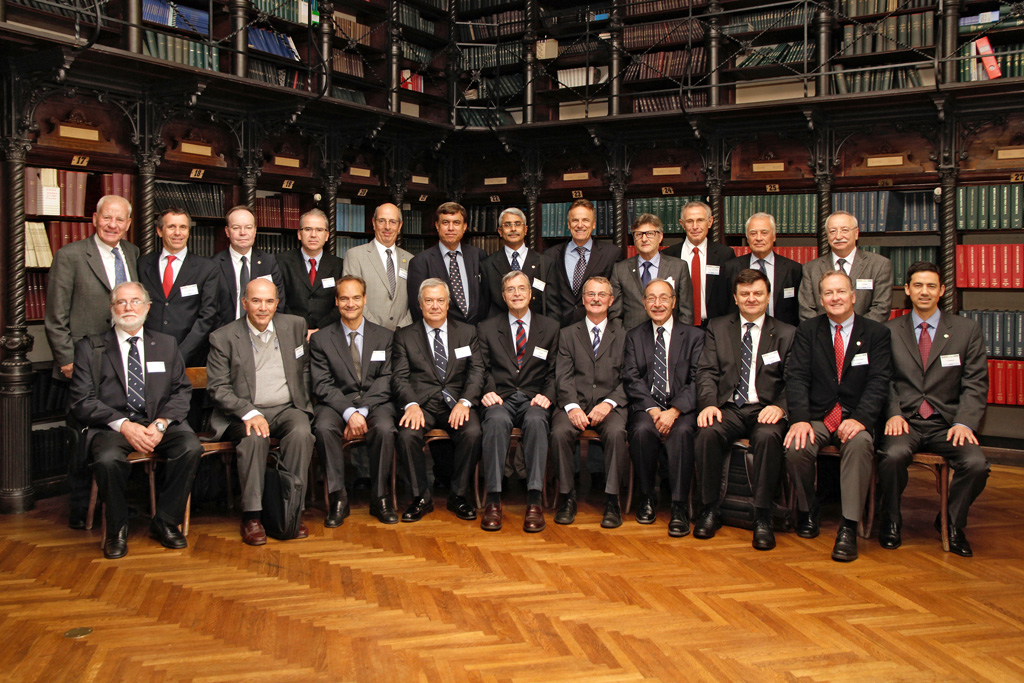
At one of the World Academy of Neurological Surgery's meetings

He is holding / has held the following positions:

- Honorary President of World Federation of Neurosurgical Societies
- Honorary President of Asian Australasian Society of Neurological Surgeons
- Chairman (2021-'25), World Federation of Neurosurgical Societies Foundation
- First V-P (2019-'21), World Federation of Neurosurgical Societies
- President (2016-'22), World Federation of Skull Base Societies
- President (2015-'17), International Conference on Cerebrovascular Surgery
- President (2015-'19), Asian Australasian Society of Neurological Surgeons
- President (2004-'06), Asian Congress of Neurological Surgeons
- President (2008-'09), Neurological Society of India
- President (2002-'04), Skull Base Surgery Society of India
- President (2010-'11), Cerebrovascular Society of India
- President (2009-'10), Bombay Neurosciences Association

== Awards ==
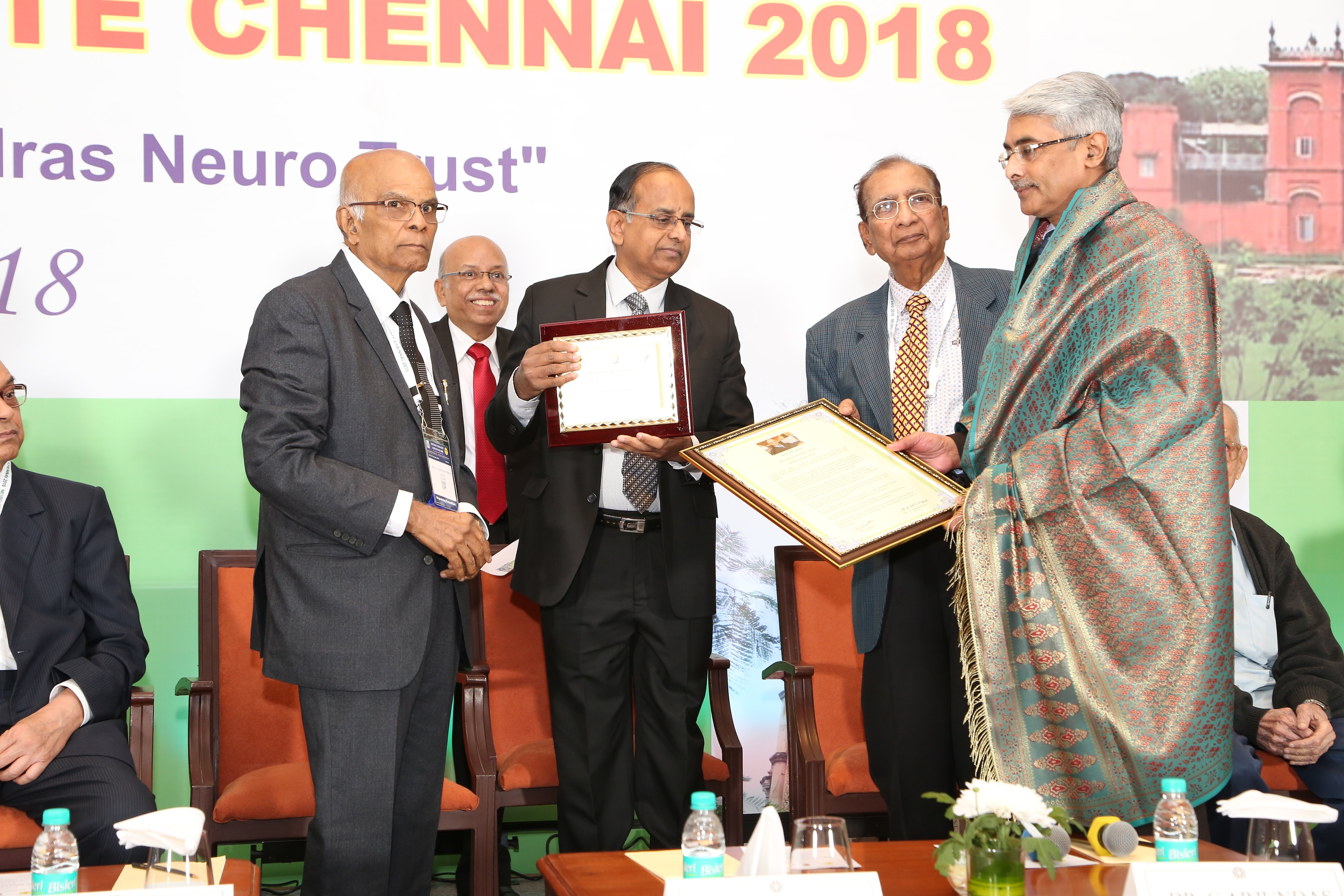
Lifetime Achievement Award - 2018 by the Madras Neuro Trust

- Distinguished Alumnus Award (1969) - Demonstration Multipurpose School, Bhubaneswar
- Best Graduate Award (1975) - Sambalpur University
- Best Post-Graduate Award (1980) - Delhi University
- Commonwealth Medical Scholarship (1984) - British Medical Council
- Dr. B. C. Roy National Award (2018) - Medical Council of India
- International Lifetime Recognition Award (2020) - American Association of Neurological Surgeons

== Charity ==
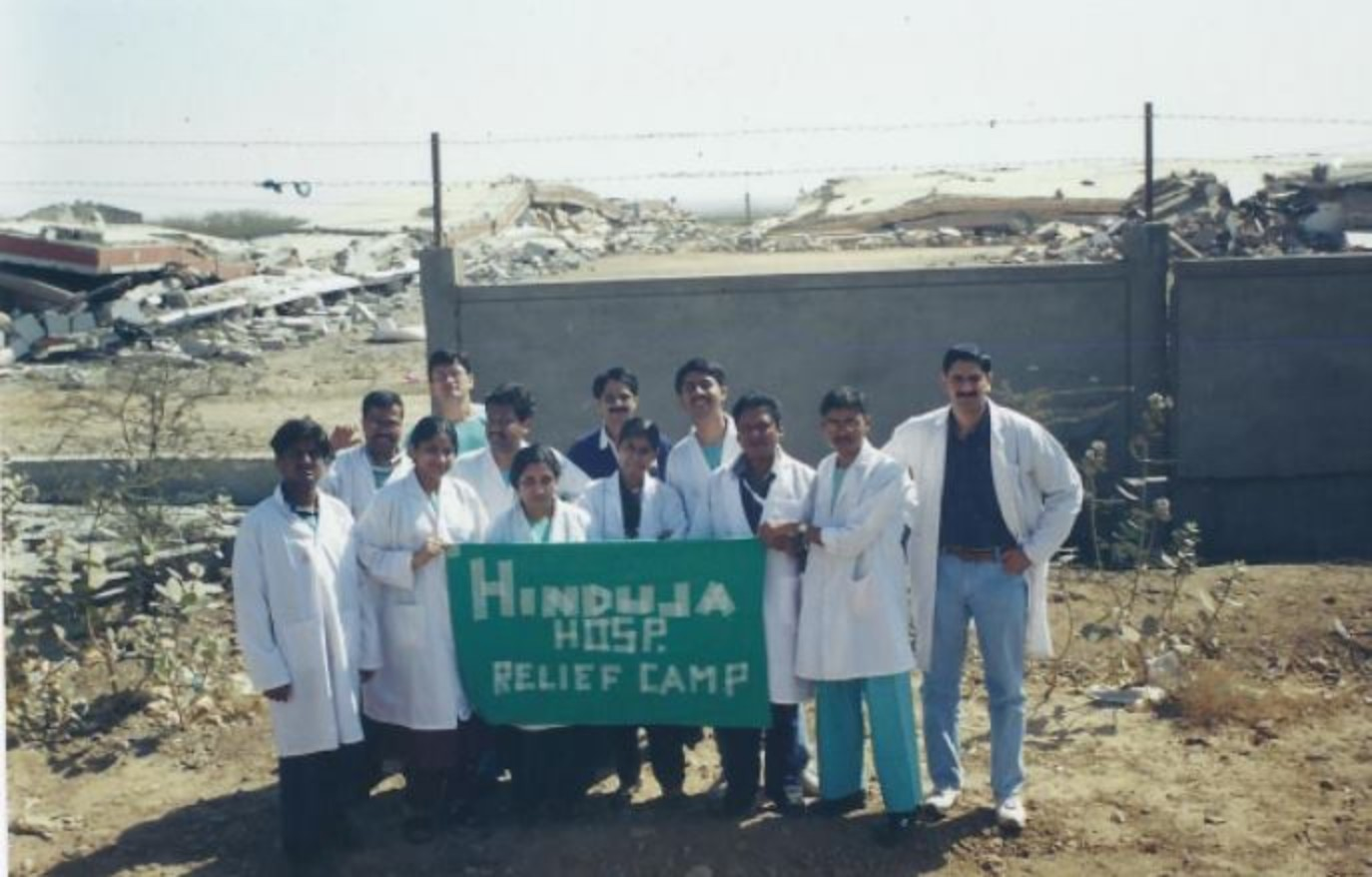
In Bhuj, after the 2001 Gujarat earthquake

He runs a free weekly clinic at Hinduja Hospital, Mahim, providing free consultations to patients from the weaker sections of the society. He also waives off his surgical fees, either partially or completely.

Along with Cardiac surgeon, Ramakanta Panda and former Police Commissioner of Mumbai, Arup Patnaik, he set up the Konark Cancer Foundation for patients coming to the Tata Memorial Hospital for cancer treatment, providing them with financial support of up to INR 100,000 per patient, logistical support such as finding food and shelter for their attendants, providing other voluntary support, collecting and donating blood, medications and prosthesis. Around 125,000 patients and their families have been benefited since its inception.

He started the Baidyanath Neurosurgery Charitable Trust to fund travelling fellowships of young neurosurgeons (below 40 years) from both public and private sectors, and of senior neurosurgeons from only the public sector, seeking advanced training abroad.
