= Robin Sengupta =

Indian-British neurosurgeon

Ram Prasad Sengupta
- রাম প্রসাদ সেনগুপ্ত
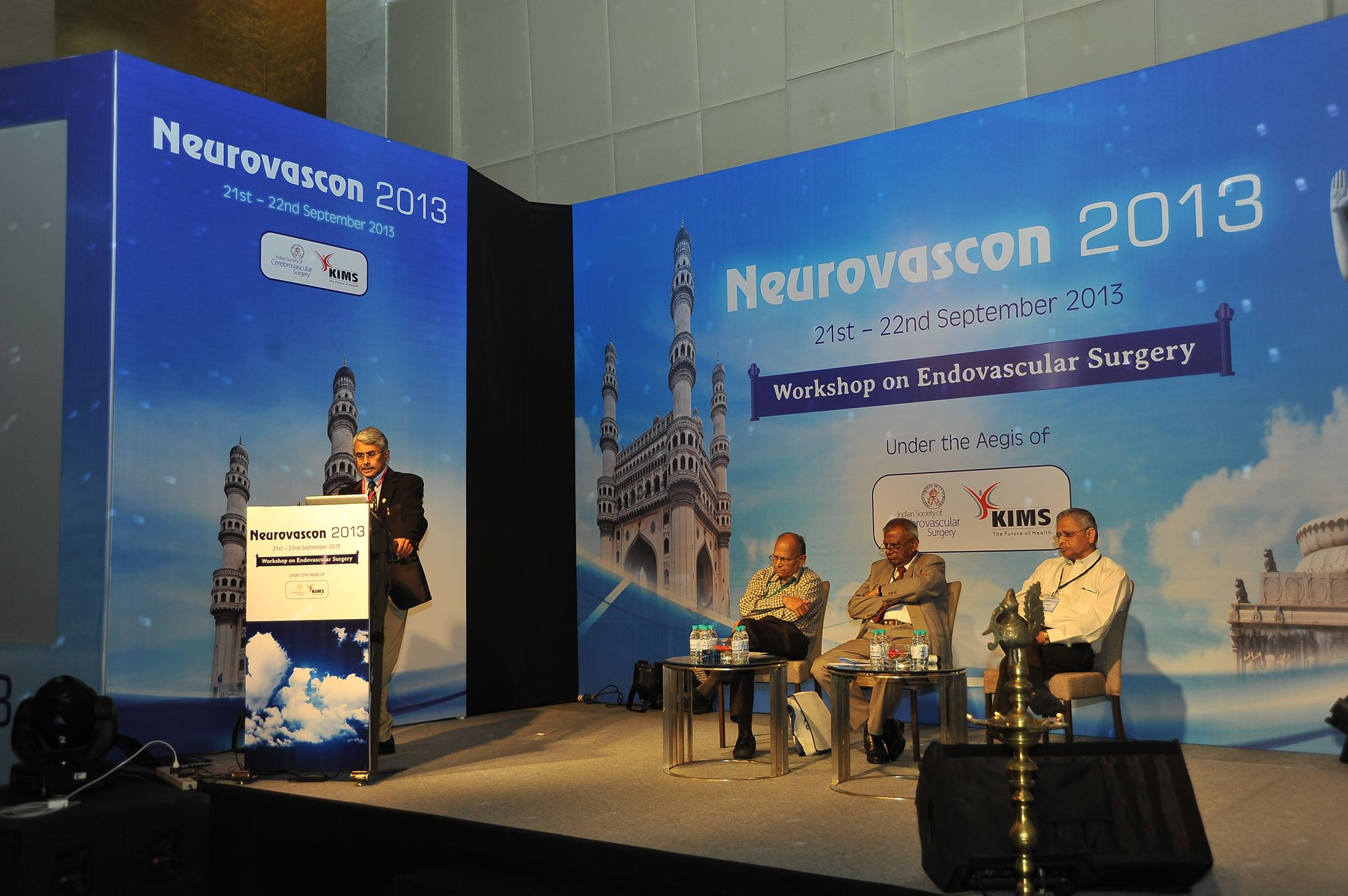
- Sengupta (third from left) at Neurovascon 2013
- Born: December 31, 1937 (age 88); Chittagong, Bengal Presidency, British India (now in Bangladesh)
- Other name: Robin Sengupta
- Education: Calcutta University; Newcastle University
- Known for: Pioneering techniques in brain aneurysm surgery; Founding the Institute of Neurosciences, Kolkata
- Spouse: Tapati Sengupta (m. 1961)
- Children: 2 (1 deceased)
- Awards: Honorary Doctorate of Medicine by Newcastle University (2016); Order of the British Empire (2017); Medal of Honour by WFNS (2017)
- Scientific career
- Fields: Neurosurgery
- Workplaces: Institute of Neurosciences, Kolkata; Newcastle General Hospital
- Thesis: (1977)

Ram Prasad "Robin" Sengupta OBE FRCS (born December 31, 1937) is an Indian-born British neurosurgeon, academic, and founder-chairman of the Institute of Neurosciences, Kolkata. Considered a leading figure in the world of neurosurgery, he was dubbed "Neurosurgeon of the Millennium" by the Neurological Society of India in 2000.

== Early life and education ==
Ram Prasad Sengupta was born on December 31, 1937 in Chittagong, Bengal Presidency, British India (now in Bangladesh). He was the second son of a poor Bengali family. Owing to poverty, his family was unable to send him to school, and as a child he earned a living by selling fruit in the streets. Intent on becoming a doctor, he borrowed notebooks from his schoolgoing friends for studying; at 14, he started tutoring a number of children, which enabled him to earn enough to enrol in a school and pay its fees. He eventually earned a scholarship, which helped him cover the costs for the remainder of his schooling years.

Sengupta moved to Calcutta, the capital of West Bengal, India in 1955 to study medicine. Aided by a stranger, he was able to join a medical programme at Calcutta University. A refugee, he worked odd jobs and used his refugee stipend to pay college fees, and graduated from the university in 1961. The same year, he relocated to England, and started working at the Bury General Hospital in Bury, Greater Manchester. While studying surgery, he joined the National Health Service (NHS). Sengupta obtained a Fellowship of the Royal Colleges of Surgeons from Edinburgh in 1967, and one from England in 1969. He also spent some time studying at Harvard University in the United States during the 1970s. He did his MSc from Newcastle University in 1976.

== Career ==
Sengupta moved to Newcastle in 1962, and joined the Newcastle General Hospital. In the early 1970s, he attempted to shift back to India in search of work, even landing a job at Safdarjung Hospital, New Delhi in 1973. However, dissatisfied with the kind of work he was offered, he retreated to England. Around the same time, he found work at the Massachusetts General Hospital in Boston, Massachusetts under Dr. William H. Sweet, then chief of neurosurgery at the hospital. However, he soon returned to Newcastle to continue working at the NHS, where he eventually became a consultant neurosurgeon.

Sengupta worked at the Newcastle General Hospital for nearly 50 years, retiring in December 2012 and becoming an emeritus consultant. He also worked for some time at the Royal Victoria Infirmary (RVI) in Newcastle. He is widely considered a doyen in the field of aneurysm surgery, having made it his area of research and authoring publications on subject. A specialist in intracranial aneurysms, Sengupta has pioneered new techniques in brain aneurysm surgery — leading to high-profile referrals from India, the United Kingdom, and the rest of the world. In the 1980s, during the presidency of R. Venkataraman, Sengupta famously treated his wife, Janaki Venkataraman, for a brain haemorrhage.

In 1997, he founded, alongside medical professors Chandranath Sen and Abhijit Guha, the National Neuroscience Centre (NNC) in Kolkata, a joint-venture. A few years later, in 2009, he established the Institute of Neurosciences, Kolkata, built with the help of donations from friends, colleagues, patients and Sengupta's own savings. It is twinned with the Newcastle General Hospital. A non-profit, the institute emphasizes affordable neurological care, and is run in collaboration with the Kolkata Municipal Corporation and the Government of West Bengal. The 2023 Times Health Survey ranked it the best single speciality hospital for neurology in India. As of 2025, the institute is undergoing expansion, with the development of a medical college, a speciality hospital, and other facilities underway.

Sengupta is also a fellow of the National Academy of Sciences, India, an emeritus fellow at Durham University, Durham, and an emeritus professor of neurosurgery at Tamil Nadu Dr. M.G.R. Medical University, Chennai.

== Honours and awards ==
Sengupta has been awarded titles and honours throughout his career for his contributions to neurosurgery. In 2002-03, the Newcastle Hospitals NHS Foundation Trust named a neurosurgical theatre in his honour. In 2003, the BBC selected him from a bulk of 20,000 surgeons from the United Kingdom for a medical documentary, A Picture of Health. He was appointed an Officer of the Order of the British Empire in 2017 for "his services to people with neurological disease in the UK & India; and to the UK-India relationship." He was awarded the "Medal of Honour" by the World Federation of Neurosurgical Societies (WFNS) for his impact on neurosurgery in 2017, becoming the first Indian to be bestowed with the award. In December 2012, the former president of India, A. P. J. Abdul Kalam, awarded him the "Vivekananda Samman Award." On 15 July 2016, Sengupta was awarded an honorary Doctorate of Medicine by Newcastle University. In 2019, a road in Chittagong was named in his honour. He has also received, from multiple organisations, a number of lifetime achievement awards.

== Personal life ==
Sengupta married Tapati Sengupta in 1961. They had a son, born in 1963, and a daughter, Anita, born in 1965. His son passed away in an accident in 1983.

He divides his time between Kolkata, where he works at the Institute of Neurosciences, and Fenham, Newcastle, where he lives with his family.

== Selected publications ==
- Sengupta, R.P.; Chiu, J.S.; Brierley, H. (1975). "Quality of survival following direct surgery for anterior communicating artery aneurysms". Journal of Neurosurgery. 43 (1): 58–64. doi:10.3171/jns.1975.43.1.0058. PMID 1141984.
- Sengupta, R.P.; Lassman, L.P.; de Moraes, A.A.; Garvan, N. (1975). "Treatment of internal carotid bifurcation aneurysms by direct surgery". Journal of Neurosurgery. 43 (3): 343–351. doi:10.3171/jns.1975.43.3.0343. PMID 1151471.
- Sengupta, R.P.; So, S.C.; Villarejo-Ortega, F.J. (1976). "Use of epsilon aminocaproic acid (EACA) in the preoperative management of ruptured intracranial aneurysms". Journal of Neurosurgery. 44 (4): 479–484. doi:10.3171/jns.1976.44.4.0479. PMID 1255236.
- Sengupta, R.P.; Gryspeerdt, G.L.; Hankinson, J. (1976). "Carotid-ophthalmic aneurysms". Journal of Neurosurgery. 39 (9): 837–853. doi:10.1136/jnnp.39.9.837. PMC 492471. PMID 993805.
- Sengupta, R.P.; Saunders, M.; Clarke, P.R. (1978). "Unruptured intracranial aneurysms--an unusual source of epilepsy". Acta Neurochirurgica. 40 (1–2): 45–53. doi:10.1007/BF01773114. PMID 654968.
- Sengupta, Ram Prasad (2015). "My serendipitous move to neurosurgery". Neurology India. 63 (2): 128–129. doi:10.4103/0028-3886.156269. PMID 25947972.
