= Bibic (charity) =

United Kingdom-based charity

Bibic is a small charitable organization based in the United Kingdom that supports children, young people and their families who have a wide range of different conditions. The organisation was founded in the early 1970s by the late Keith Pennock who had a daughter with a learning disability. The work was derived from Glenn Doman's The Institutes for The Achievement of Human Potential (IAHP) in Philadelphia, USA.

A variety of therapeutic approaches are used. There is no peer reviewed research into the effectiveness of therapy for this condition. The organisation raises funds and receives no Government funding.

This organisation was set up at Knowle Hall near Bridgwater, Somerset in 1976, using staff trained at the IAHP. However, since 2014, its National Assessment Centre has been based at Old Kelways, just outside the town of Langport, also in Somerset.

== Formation of a UK Organisation for brain injured children ==
Keith Pennock's book Rescuing brain injured children describes the impetus for starting the organisation as his daughter, who had developmental delay. In 1970 the family travelled from the UK to Philadelphia and attended The Institutes for The Achievement of Human Potential (IAHP). The family adopted the Doman-Delecato patterning technique in the UK.

A precursor to bibic, was opened in Staffordshire later the same year, as news spread of the family and their use of the new therapy method. Local residents began to give donations and offer their time. The British Institute for the Achievement of Human Potential (BIAHP) was established in 1974, with staff being trained directly at the IAHP in Philadelphia. The family and fledgeling organisation moved to Knowle Hall near Bridgwater, Somerset in 1976.

Many of the children they work with have disorders of the nervous system, or inherited characteristics, which affect the way the body or brain develops. These include: acquired and traumatic brain injury, Down syndrome, cerebral palsy, autism, Specific developmental disorders, attention deficit hyperactivity disorder and learning disability including dyslexia, developmental coordination disorder and dyscalculia. Unlike many other organisations, bibic also works with children that have no formal diagnosis at all.

In 1979, the IAHP (under the management of Glenn Doman) were turning their interests to "well children" with the introduction of a Better Babies programme. The board of the BIAHP felt that they could not support this shift in focus and wanted to continue their work solely with children who had a brain injury, therefore through necessity the British Institute of Brain Injured Children was launched as an independent organisation in 1980 – no links with the IAHP were retained, and staff began to be trained in the UK. In 1987 a research piece was commissioned to demonstrate the effectiveness of the programme, in association with the University of Surrey.

Keith Pennock resigned from his post as chief executive of BIBIC in early 1996. In 1999, research covering the period 1995-1997 at BIBIC was published. In a letter to the [journal] editor, the authors of the appraisal report noted that strong similarities to the Doman-Delecato Patterning method (a therapy by this point widely condemned) remained strong despite BIBIC making revisions, and that areas of the therapy caused concern. BIBIC responded later that year, informing the journal that significant changes had been made to the programme, with the appraisal report being a much-anticipated catalyst for doing so. Since these revisions and under new management the organisation has been registered as a charity, and is now known only as "bibic". Bibic remains an active organisation and also provides policy input.

Bibic now reports to base its programme of developmental therapy on more recent research based on the concept of neuroplasticity, the brain's ability to undergo alterations in response to internal and external environmental changes. Bibic moved to Langport, also in Somerset, in 2014.
