= Claire Karekezi =

Rwandan neurosurgeon (born 1982)

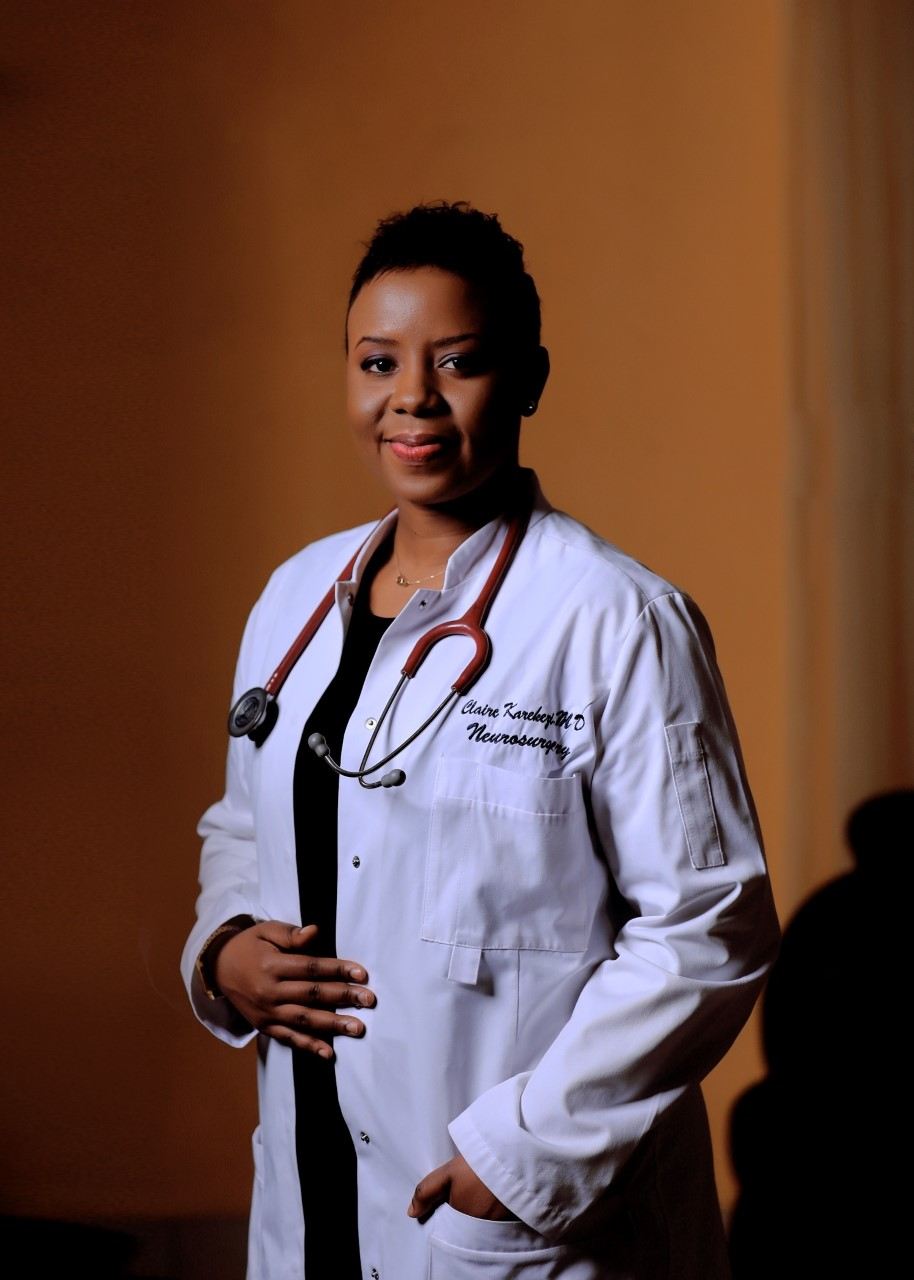
- Karekezi in 2022
- Born: 4 July 1982 (age 44); Butare, Rwanda
- Education: University of Rwanda (MD)Mohammed V University (Neurosurgery) University of Toronto (Neuro-oncology and Skull-Base Surgery)
- Occupation: Neurosurgeon

Claire Karekezi (born 4 July 1982) is a Rwandan neurosurgeon at the Rwanda Military Teaching Hospital in Kigali, Rwanda. As the first female neurosurgeon in Rwanda, and one of the eight Rwandan neurosurgeons serving a population of 14 million, Karekezi serves as an advocate for women in neurosurgery. She has become an inspiration for young people pursuing neurosurgery, particularly young women.

Specializing in neuro-oncology and skull-base surgery, Karekezi served as the chairperson of the African Women in Neurosurgery (AWIN), Committee of the Continental Association of African Neurosurgical Societies (CAANS) from 2019 to 2023, and was elected as a member of the national council of the Rwanda Medical and Dental Council (RMDC) and the secretary of the Bureau for 2022–2026 and 2026-2030 terms.

== Early life ==
Karekezi was born in Butare, Rwanda. Mr. Karekezi Sr., her father, was a telecommunication engineer, and Mrs. Musine, her mother, was a high school teacher. Karekezi grew up in Kigali, the capital city of Rwanda, where she and her two older siblings received their early education. She enjoyed science as a child, and after sixth grade in elementary school, she majored in mathematics and physics in high school.

She met the admission criteria for medical school and studied general medicine at the University of Rwanda College of Medicine and Health Sciences, graduating as an MD in March 2009. In Butare, Karekezi had her first exposure to neurosurgery, an experience that changed the course of her life.

== Education ==
Karekezi attended the College of Medicine and Health Sciences, University of Rwanda (UR), where she graduated with honors in General Medicine in 2009. In 2007, she participated in an International Federation of Medical Students' Associations professional exchange at the Linköping Teaching Hospital in Sweden. There, she met Professor Jan Hillman, who had an impact on her decision to pursue a career in neurosurgery. In February 2009, following a brief stay in Sweden, Karekezi completed an elective program at the Department of Neurosurgery, John Radcliffe Hospital, University of Oxford.

In 2011, she was accepted into the World Federation of Neurosurgical Societies (WFNS) Reference center in Rabat for training African neurosurgeons. This training center was established in 2002 through a partnership between the WFNS and the Faculty of Medicine and Pharmacy of Rabat at Mohammed V University in Rabat, Morocco. Karekezi completed her residency in neurosurgery in May 2016.

After completing her residency in Morocco Karekezi pursued additional training with a focus on Neuro-oncology. In 2016, she spent three months at the Brigham and Women's Hospital in Boston, Massachusetts, as a recipient of the American Association of Neurological Surgeons (AANS) International Visiting Surgeon Fellowship. From 2017 to 2018, she completed a one-year clinical fellowship in neuro oncology and Skull-Base Surgery at Toronto Western Hospital, major research and teaching hospital affiliated to the University of Toronto.

After completing her fellowship in Toronto in August 2018, Karekezi returned to Rwanda as the country's first female neurosurgeon. In her December 2018 TEDxEuston talk, she painted a clearer picture of the general lack of access to surgery in Africa and the role she plays in training more future neurosurgeons to address this deficit. Karekezi stated, "I refuse to allow being African and a woman to be a limitation for me." She has raised awareness about the significance of neurosurgical education on the African continent, the need for more female neurosurgeons to combat stereotypes, and the severe shortage of neurosurgeons in the continent.

== Professional career and mission ==
Karekezi joined the Rwanda Military Teaching Hospital (RMTH) in January 2019 as the hospital's first consultant neurosurgeon and the first neurosurgeon to perform neurosurgical procedures there. The establishment of a neurosurgery practice in the Rwandan public health sector has not been devoid of obstacles. Upon establishing her practice at RMRTH, she devoted the first few months of her tenure to establishing a functional neurosurgical unit by acquiring the necessary surgical equipment and personnel.

Neurosurgery continues to be a male-dominated field, particularly in Africa, where women neurosurgeons account for less than 12% of all neurosurgeons. Karekezi is determined to enhance mentorship and support for her female colleagues and future generations. In 2019, she was elected as the chair of the African Women in Neurosurgery (AWIN) section of the Continental Association of African Neurosurgical Societies (CAANS).

Karekezi has led numerous projects on the history of women in neurosurgery and their current status on the African continent, highlighting the underrepresentation of women in leadership positions and academic neurosurgery, efforts to improve Neurosurgery Education and brain tumor treatment advances particularly in Sub-Saharan Africa. She continues to raise awareness about the need for more experienced female neurosurgeons in order to assist other young women in overcoming various obstacles inherent to the field. She is an advocate and inspiration for other young women who wish to pursue STEM fields (science, engineering, technology, and mathematics).

== Awards ==
- Association of Neurological Surgeons (AANS)/Congress of Neurological Surgeons (CNS) Women In Neurosurgery (WINS) Greg Wilkins-Barrick Chair Visiting International Surgeon Award (2013)
- American Association of Neurological Surgeons (AANS) International Visiting Surgeon Fellowship Award in Neurosurgery/neuro oncology, Brigham and Women's Hospital, Harvard Medical School, USA (2016)
- Shield Maiden Women in Surgery Africa (WISA) Award in recognition of the arête in achieving career excellence in surgery, COSECSA, Kigali (2018).
- AIMS-Next Einstein Initiative TTP Women in science 'First Award 2019' for being Rwanda's First Female Neurosurgeon (2019)
- Forbes Woman Africa Academic Excellence Award (2022)
- Trailblazer in her Surgical Specialty (Neurosurgery), Women In Surgery Rwanda (WiSR), June 2024. Kigali, Rwanda
- 2024 Mission:BRAIN Uihlein Visiting Scholar Award, Women in Global Neuroscience (WINGS) Symposium, Mission:BRAIN Foundation, October 2024, Houston, USA

== Memberships ==
Dr. Karekezi is an active member of multiple local and international neurosurgical societies in order to raise awareness of neurosurgical needs in low- and middle-income countries, inspire young women, and be in a position to make change. These societies include the American Association of Neurological surgeons (AANS), the AANS/CNS section on tumors, World Federation of Neurosurgical Societies-Women In Neurosurgery (WFNS-WIN) Committee, Women in Neurosurgery (WINS/USA), African Women in Neurosurgery (AWIN), the College of Surgeons of East, Central and Southern Africa (COSECSA), the Society for Neuro-Oncology (SNO), Women in Surgery AFRICA (WiSA), the Society for Neuro-Oncology/SSA (SNOSSA), Rwanda Surgical Society (RSS), and Rwanda Association of Neurological Surgeons (RANS).

== Selected publications ==
- Nepogodiev D, Picciochi M, Ademuyiwa A, Adisa A, Agbeko AE, Aguilera ML, Agyei F, Alexander P, Henry J, Anyomih TTK, Aregawi AB, Atun R, Biccard B, Chalwe M, Chu K, Coomarasamy A, Crawford R, Darzi A, Davies J, Gathuya Z, George C, Ghaffar A, Ghosh D, Glasbey JC, Haque PD, Harrison EM, Hesse A, Allen Ingabire JC, Kamarajah SK, Karekezi C, Kruger D, Lapitan MC, Latif A, Lawani I, Ledda V, Li E, Linder C, Makasa E, Martin J, Maswime S, Mathai S, Meara JG, Mudede-Moffat F, Ntirenganya F, Park KB, Phelan LN, Pramesh CS, Ramos-De la Medina A, Raykar N, Rivello R, Roslani AC, Roy N, Samad L, Shrime M, Sobhy S, Sullivan R, Tabiri S, Tangi V, Tissingh E, Weiser TG, Williams O, Bhangu A. Surgical health policy 2025-35: strengthening essential services for tomorrow's needs. Lancet. 2025 Jul 14:S0140-6736(25)00985-7. doi: 10.1016/S0140-6736(25)00985-7. Epub ahead of print. PMID 40675172.
- Karekezi C. Global neurosurgery partnership: need for more adequate collaborations between high-income countries and low-income countries. Acta Neurochir (Wien). 2024 Apr 12;166(1):176. doi: 10.1007/s00701-024-06061-7.
- Nyalundja AD, Kanmounye US, Karekezi C, Laeke T, Thango N, Balogun JA. Pediatric brain tumors in sub-Saharan Africa: a systematic review and meta-analysis. J Neurosurg Pediatr. 2024 Mar 15;:1-12.
- Nyalundja AD, Mugisha F, Karekezi C. The Natural History and Treatment of Meningiomas: An Update. Semin Neurol. 2024 Feb;44(1):1-15.
- Almeida JP, Marigil-Sanchez M, Karekezi C, Witterick I, Gentili F. Different Approaches in Skull Base Surgery Carry Risks for Different Types of Complications. Acta Neurochir Suppl. 2023;130:13-18.
- Barthélemy EJ, Diouf SA, Silva ACV, Abu-Bonsrah N, de Souza IAS, Kanmounye US, Gabriel P, Sarpong K, Nduom EK, Lartigue JW, Esene I, Karekezi C. Historical determinants of neurosurgical inequities in Africa and the African diaspora: A review and analysis of coloniality. PLOS Glob Public Health. 2023;3(2):e0001550. doi:10.1371/journal.pgph.0001550. eCollection 2023. Review.
- Kanmounye US, Karekezi C, Nyalundja AD, Awad AK, Laeke T, Balogun JA. Adult brain tumors in Sub-Saharan Africa: A scoping review. Neuro Oncol. 2022 Oct 3;24(10):1799-1806. doi: 10.1093/neuonc/noac098. Review.
- Dada OE, Karekezi C, Mbangtang CB, Chellunga ES, Mbaye T, Konan L, Adeniran Bankole ND, Merci Kabulo KD, Hugues Dokponou YC, Ghomsi NC, Negida A, Nguembu S, Thango N, Cheserem B, Kamabu LK, Alalade AF, Esene I, Kanmounye US. State of Neurosurgical Education in Africa: A Narrative Review. World Neurosurg. 2021 Jul;151:172-181.
- Karekezi C, Thango N, Aliu-Ibrahim SA, Bechri H, You Broalet EM, Bougrine M, Cheserem JB, Mbaye M, Shabhay ZA, Tighilt N, Bakhti S, El Abbadi N. History of African women in neurosurgery. Neurosurg Focus. 2021 Mar;50(3).
- Karekezi C, El Khamlichi A, El Ouahabi A, El Abbadi N, Ahokpossi SA, Ahanogbe KMH, Berete I, Bouya SM, Coulibaly O, Dao I, Djoubairou BO, Doleagbenou AAK, Egu KP, Ekouele Mbaki HB, Kinata-Bambino SB, Habibou LM, Mousse AN, Ngamasata T, Ntalaja J, Onen J, Quenum K, Seylan D, Sogoba Y, Servadei F, Germano IM. The impact of African-trained neurosurgeons on sub-Saharan Africa. Neurosurg Focus. 2020 Mar 1;48(3):E4.
- Marigil Sanchez M, Karekezi C, Almeida JP, Kalyvas A, Castro V, Velasquez C, Gentili F. Management of Giant Pituitary Adenomas: Role and Outcome of the Endoscopic Endonasal Surgical Approach. Neurosurg Clin N Am. 2019 Oct;30(4):433-444.
- Karekezi C, El Khamlichi A. Takeoff of African Neurosurgery and the World Federation of Neurosurgical Societies Rabat Training Center Alumni. World Neurosurg. 2019 Jun; 126:576-580. doi: 10.1016/j.wneu.2019.03.141. Epub 2019 Mar 22.
