= William Couldwell =

Canadian neurosurgeon

William T. Couldwell
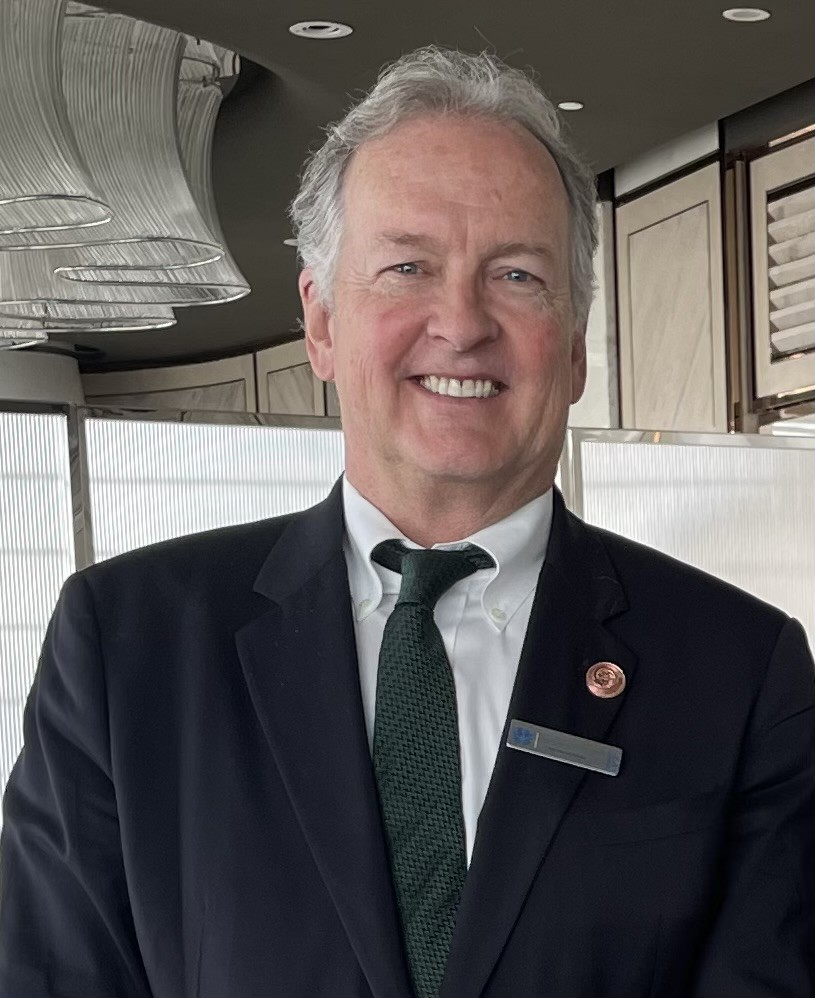
- Born: British Columbia, Canada
- Education: MD–PhD
- Alma mater: University of British Columbia; Dalhousie University; McGill University
- Occupation: Neurosurgeon
- Years active: 1980s–present
- Employer(s): University of Utah; University of Southern California; New York Medical College
- Known for: Skull base surgery Pituitary and parasellar tumors Vascular surgery
- Awards: Harvey Cushing Medal (AANS); Bittner Award (AANS); Charles Ballance Skull Base Surgery Medal (British Skull Base Society); Wood Gold Medal (McGill University School of Medicine)

William T. Couldwell is a Canadian-born neurosurgeon, academic physician, and medical educator. He is Professor of Neurosurgery at the University of Utah and is internationally recognized for his work in skull base surgery, pituitary and parasellar disease, cerebrovascular neurosurgery, and neuro-oncology. His research includes highly cited clinical series, cost-effectiveness analyses, and translational studies published in leading neurosurgical and medical journals.

== Early life and education ==
Couldwell was born in British Columbia, Canada. He completed undergraduate training in physical chemistry and biology before earning a combined MD–PhD degree at McGill University, where his doctoral work focused on neuroimmunology and molecular biology. During medical school, he received several academic distinctions, including the Wood Gold Medal awarded by McGill University's School of Medicine.

He completed internship and residency training in neurosurgery at the University of Southern California, followed by postdoctoral research and clinical fellowships at the Montreal Neurological Institute and the Centre Hospitalier Universitaire Vaudois (CHUV) in Lausanne, Switzerland.

== Academic and clinical career ==
Couldwell joined the faculty at the University of Southern California in the early 1990s, where he held leadership roles in epilepsy surgery and skull base surgery. He later served as Professor and Chair of Neurosurgery at New York Medical College before being appointed Professor and Chair of the Department of Neurosurgery at the University of Utah in 2002.

At the University of Utah, he developed multidisciplinary clinical and research programs in skull base surgery, pituitary disorders, neuro-oncology, and cerebrovascular disease. He has been actively involved in graduate medical education and has mentored numerous neurosurgeons who later became department chairs and academic leaders in North America and internationally.

== Research contributions ==
Couldwell has authored or coauthored approximately 900 publications, including original peer-reviewed research articles, clinical trials, systematic reviews, and authoritative book chapters. His work has influenced clinical practice, surgical technique, and health-care policy in neurosurgery. He has edited several books.

=== Skull base and transsphenoidal surgery ===
Couldwell is recognized for advancing surgical techniques for complex skull base tumors. His collaborative work on extended and parasellar transsphenoidal approaches documented outcomes in large surgical series and contributed to the standardization of extended skull base techniques.

He co-authored "The history and evolution of transsphenoidal surgery", a landmark review published in the Journal of Neurosurgery that remains a foundational reference for neurosurgeons. He is also an editor and contributor to the textbook Skull Base Surgery of the Posterior Fossa (2017), which synthesizes contemporary approaches to posterior fossa pathology.

=== Cerebrovascular neurosurgery and health-care value research ===
In cerebrovascular neurosurgery, Couldwell has published influential work on aneurysm management and surgical decision-making. His studies include analyses of treatment selection for unruptured intracranial aneurysms and comparative outcomes of open versus endovascular approaches in the era of flow diversion.

He has also contributed to neurosurgical health-economics research, including cost analyses of cerebrovascular aneurysm treatment and cost drivers in lumbar interbody fusion procedures, using large institutional and value driven outcomes databases. These studies are among the earlier neurosurgical publications to rigorously evaluate cost variation alongside clinical outcomes.

=== Neuro-oncology and translational research ===
Couldwell's neuro-oncology research spans gliomas, meningiomas, and metastatic disease. His large clinical series on petroclival meningiomas provided long-term outcome data for one of the most technically challenging skull base tumor locations.

In translational research, he has co-authored studies on molecular markers in glioma, including work demonstrating that IGFBP2 expression predicts survival in IDH-mutant glioma, contributing to prognostic stratification in neuro-oncology.

=== Neural progenitor and basic neuroscience research ===
Among his most highly cited basic science publications is "In vitro neurogenesis by progenitor cells isolated from the adult human hippocampus," published in Nature Medicine. This study demonstrated neurogenic potential in adult human tissue and became a highly influential contribution to the field of neural stem cell biology.

== Professional leadership ==
Couldwell has held numerous leadership roles in organized neurosurgery. He served as President of the American Association of Neurological Surgeons, President of the American Academy of Neurological Surgery, President of the World Academy of Neurological Surgery, and President of the International Meningioma Society. He also served as a director of the American Board of Neurological Surgery, including leadership of its oral and written examination committees.

He has held senior editorial roles for major neurosurgical journals, including Editor-in-Chief of Neurosurgical Focus, and has served on editorial boards for Journal of Neurosurgery, Journal of Neurology, Neurosurgery and Psychiatry, Journal of Neuro-Oncology, and related publications.

== Honors and awards ==
Couldwell has received numerous honors recognizing his clinical, scientific, and professional contributions. Notable awards include:

- Harvey Cushing Medal, American Association of Neurological Surgeons (2022)
- Bittner Award, American Association of Neurological Surgeons (2010; 2022)
- Charles Ballance Skull Base Surgery Medal, British Skull Base Society (2018)
- Donaghy Award, American Association of Neurological Surgeons
- Synthes Skull Base Surgery Award, American Association of Neurological Surgeons
- Penfield Lectureship, Canadian Neurosciences Federation
- Wood Gold Medal, McGill University School of Medicine (1984)

== Selected publications ==
- Ezzat S, Asa SL, Couldwell WT, et al. The prevalence of pituitary adenomas: a systematic review. Cancer (2004).
- Couldwell WT, Fukushima T, Giannotta SL, Weiss MH. Petroclival meningiomas: surgical experience in 109 cases. J Neurosurg (1996).
- Couldwell WT, Weiss MH, Rabb C, Liu JK, Apfelbaum RI, Fukushima T. Variations on the transsphenoidal approach, with emphasis on extended transsphenoidal craniotomy and parasellar approaches: experience with 105 cases. Neurosurgery (2004).
- Roy NS, Wang S, Jiang L, et al.; Couldwell WT, et al. In vitro neurogenesis by progenitor cells isolated from the adult human hippocampus. Nature Medicine.
- Couldwell WT, Liu JK, Amini A, Kan P. Submandibular interpositional carotid bypass for skull base tumors and giant aneurysms. Neurosurgery (2006).
- Altay T, Patel BC, Couldwell WT. Lateral orbital wall approach to the cavernous sinus. J Neurosurg (2012).
- Makarenko S, Alzahrani I, Karsy M, Deopujari C, Couldwell WT. Outcomes and surgical nuances in management of giant pituitary adenomas: a review of 108 cases in the endoscopic era. J Neurosurg (2022).
- Huang LE, Cohen AL, Colman H, Jensen RL, Fults DW, Couldwell WT. IGFBP2 expression predicts IDH-mutant glioma patient survival. Oncotarget (2017).
- Couldwell WT, Mazur MD, et al. Contemporary endovascular and open aneurysm treatment in the era of flow diversion. Journal of Neurology, Neurosurgery & Psychiatry (2018).
- Couldwell WT, Nassiri F, Rawanduzy C, Cole K, Jha AK. Resectability of spheno-orbital meningiomas: surgical outcome in 93 cases and a proposed clinically relevant anatomical classification. J Neurosurg (2026).
- Skull Base Surgery of the Posterior Fossa (2017).
- Neurosurgery Knowledge Update: A Comprehensive Review (2015).
