= Temple Fay =

American neurologist and neurosurgeon (1895–1963)

Temple Sedgwick Fay, M.D. (January 9, 1895, Seattle – March 7, 1963, Philadelphia) was an American neurologist and neurosurgeon. He is known for experimental use of extreme cold to treat patients with malignant tumors or head injuries.

== Early career ==
After undergraduate study at the University of Washington, he enrolled in the University of Pennsylvania School of Medicine, where the famous neurologist William Spiller became his mentor. After graduating in 1923, Fay became at the Philadelphia General Hospital a medical intern, an assistant to Spiller, an assistant to the famous neurosurgeon Charles Harrison Frazier, and then an instructor. During the years 1923 to 1929 Fay developed several new techniques and published several important papers. He was appointed in 1929 Professor and Head of the neurosurgery department at the Temple University School of Medicine. In 1931 he, along with R. Glen Spurling, William P. Van Wagener, and R. Eustace Semmes, started the Harvey Cushing Society, which was later renamed the American Association of Neurological Surgeons (AANS). Fay became in 1937 the 6th President of the Harvey Cushing Society.

== Experimental treatments ==
In 1938 he used a crude refrigerating apparatus for his experiments, with the assistance of George C. Henny, on cryotherapy for medical patients, for the control of cancer. In December 1938 Fay demonstrated that human rectal temperature could be reduced to 92 °F (33 °C), or below, for many hours without apparent injury to the patient.

Soon after his experiments with whole-body refrigeration, Fay began studying localized cryotherapy as treatment for brain lesions. He developed small metal capsules that housed a circulating refrigerant (which he referred to as cold “bombs”) and implanted these capsules into the human brain as a local treatment for abscess, cerebritis, cancer, and osteomyelitis. In cases of open surgery for brain abscess and cerebritis, he oftentimes directly irrigated refrigerated saline and boric acid into the active area of infection. He noted satisfactory responses for both infectious and neoplastic disease processes. ... He also experimented with whole-head cooling in cases of trauma, and he developed a head wrap specifically for this purpose. ... Fay found that hypothermia is bacteriostatic, reduces inflammation and edema, and, when applied locally to cutaneous cancer metastases, produces a marked tendency toward tumor regression, infection clearance, and slow healing, with subsequently more pliable scars (greatly reduced contractures). Fay extended his research into the physiological effects of hypothermia.

Fay developed the world's first systematic program of hypothermia for traumatic brain injury (TBI). He realized that "decreased intracranial pressure and improved utilization of oxygen by cerebral tissue" would help patients with TBI.

== Late career ==
In 1943 he left Temple University and did a considerable amount of work on "psychomotor patterning" exercises for children with learning disabilities, brain injuries, or cognitive disabilities at The Institutes for the Achievement of Human Potential.

== Personal life ==
Fay married Marion Priestly Button in 1923. They had four daughters. She was the 3rd great granddaughter of Joseph Priestley (1733-1804), the discoverer of oxygen and founder of the Unitarian Church in America.
