= Brem (surname) =

Brem is a surname. Notable people with the surname include:

- Eva-Maria Brem (born 1988), Austrian alpine ski racer
- Marty Brem (born 1959), Austrian singer, record executive, and entrepreneur
- Rachel Brem, American diagnostic radiologist
- Rolf Brem (1926–2014), Swiss sculptor, illustrator, and graphic artist
- Steven Brem, American neurosurgeon
- Wilhelm Brem (born 1977), Paralympic biathlete and cross-country skier
