= AANS =

AANS may refer to:

- American Association of Neurological Surgeons
- Australian Army Nursing Service
