= Neurodevelopmentalist =

Neurodevelopmentalist may refer to:

- A person in the field of pediatric neuropsychology
- A person in the field of pediatric psychiatry
- a person certified by the Neuro-Developmental Treatment Association to practice techniques based on the Bobath concept
- a person certified by the National Academy of Child Development or the International Christian Association of Neurodevelopmentalists to practice certain kinds of techniques based on psychomotor patterning
