= Karekezi =

Karekezi is a surname. Notable people with the surname include:

- Claire Karekezi (born 1982), Rwandan neurosurgeon
- Joël Karekezi (born 1985), Rwandan screenwriter
- Olivier Karekezi (born 1983), Rwandan footballer
