= Journal of Neuro-Oncology =

- Discipline: Oncology
- Language: English
- Edited by: Jason Sheehan

Publication details
- History: 1983-present
- Publisher: Springer Science+Business Media
- Frequency: 15/year
- Impact factor: 4.506 (2021)

Standard abbreviations
- ISO 4: J. Neuro-Oncol.

Indexing
- CODEN: JNODD2
- ISSN: 0167-594X (print); 1573-7373 (web)
- OCLC no.: 890297171

Links
- Journal homepage; Online archive

The Journal of Neuro-Oncology is a peer-reviewed medical journal covering cancer of the central nervous system. It was established in 1983 and is published 15 times per year by Springer Science+Business Media. It was originally published by Martinus Nijhoff Publishers and has been published by Springer since 2005. It is the oldest continuously published journal focused on the field of Neuro-Oncology.

It is sponsored by the Tumor Section for the American Association of Neurological Surgeons and Congress of Neurological Surgeons. It is co-sponsored by the Society of British Neurological Surgeons, the European Association of Neurosurgical Societies Section of Neuro-Oncology, the Korean Neurosurgical Society, the Chinese Society for Neuro-Oncology (CSNO), the Grupo Interdisciplinario Mexicano de Investigacion en Neuro-Oncologia, the Radiosurgery Society, the Society for NeuroOncology Latin America, the Indian Society of Neuro-Oncology, and the Taiwan Society for Neuro-Oncology (TSNO).

The current editor-in-chief is Jason P. Sheehan (University of Virginia). Previous editors include Joseph M. Piepmeier (Yale University) and Linda M. Liau (David Geffen School of Medicine at UCLA).

== Abstracting and indexing ==
The journal is abstracted and indexed in:

- Science Citation Index
- MEDLINE/PubMed
- Scopus
- Embase
- Chemical Abstracts Service
- EBSCO databases
- Current Contents/Clinical Medicine
- Elsevier Biobase
- Index to Scientific & Technical Proceedings
- INIS Atomindex

According to the Journal Citation Reports, the journal has a 2020 impact factor of 4.130.

Members of the editorial board include the following:

Associate editors:

- Roger Abounader, University of Virginia School of Medicine, Charlottesville, Virginia, US
- Jill Barnholtz-Sloan, Cleveland, Ohio, US
- Eric Bouffet, University of Toronto, Toronto, Ontario, Canada
- Jeffrey N. Bruce, Columbia University, New York, NY
- Linda M. Liau, Brain Research Institute, UCLA Medical Center, Los Angeles, CA
- Arjun Sahgal, Sunnybrook Health Sciences Centre, Toronto, Ontario, Canada
- Chris Cifarelli, West Virginia University, Morgantown, WV

Editorial board:

- Manish K. Aghi, San Francisco, California, US
- Manmeet Ahluwalia, Cleveland, Ohio, US
- Marco Alegria, Mexico City, Mexico
- Mitchel S. Berger, San Francisco, California, US
- Deborah Blumenthal, Tel-Aviv, Israel
- John A. Boockvar, New York, New York, US
- Steven Brem, Philadelphia, Pennsylvania, US
- William Broaddus, Richmond, Virginia, US
- John M. Buatti, Iowa City, Iowa, US
- Miguel Angel Celis, Mexico City, Mexico
- Arnab Chakravarti, Columbus, Ohio, US
- Samuel Chao, Cleveland, Ohio, US
- Thomas C. Chen, Los Angeles, California, US
- Zhong-ping Chen, Guangzhou, China
- Shi-Yuan Cheng, Pittsburgh, Pennsylvania, US
- Christopher P. Cifarelli, Morgantown, West Virginia, US
- Charles S. Cobbs, San Francisco, California, US
- William T. Couldwell, Salt Lake City, Utah, US
- Sunit Das, Toronto, ON, Canada
- Lisa DeAngelis, New York, New York, US
- Waldemar Debinski, Winston-Salem, North Carolina, US
- Franco DeMonte, Houston, Texas, US
- Francesco DiMeco, Milan, Italy
- Ian F. Dunn, Boston, Massachusetts, US
- Gavin Dunn, St. Louis, Missouri, US
- Camilo E. Fadul, Charlottesville, Virginia, US
- Gaetano Finocchiaro, Milan, Italy
- Atul Goel, Mumbai, Maharashtra, India
- Tejpal Gupta, Mumbai, Maharashtra, India
- Costas G. Hadjipanayis, New York, New York, US
- Sanford P.S. Hsu, Taipei, Taiwan
- Martin K. Hunn, Wellington, New Zealand
- Jeong-Hyun Hwang, Daegu, Korea
- Fabio Iwamoto, New York, New York, US
- Michael D. Jenkinson, Liverpool, UK
- Randy L. Jensen, Salt Lake City, Utah, US
- Ulf D. Kahlert, Düsseldorf, Germany
- Ekkehard Kasper, Boston, Massachusetts, US
- Andrew H. Kaye, Melbourne, Australia
- Soumen Khatua, Houston, Texas, US
- Dong-Gyu Kim, Seoul, Korea
- Se-Hyuk Kim, Suwon, Korea
- John J. Kresl, Phoenix, Arizona, US
- Albert Lai, Los Angeles, California, US
- Joseph L. Lasky, Los Angeles, California, US
- Andrew B. Lassman, New York, New York, US
- Eudocia Q. Lee, Boston, Massachusetts, US
- Emilie Le Rhun, Lille, France
- Maciej Lesniak, Chicago, Illinois, US
- Michael Lim, Baltimore, Maryland, US
- Chun-Fu Lin, Taipei, Taiwan
- Pedro Lowenstein, Ann Arbor, Michigan, US
- Marcos V.C. Maldaun, São Paulo, Brazil
- Suzana M.F. Malheiros, São Paulo, Brazil
- Akira Matsuno, Tokyo, Japan
- Gordon McComb, Los Angeles, California, US
- Michael McDermott, San Francisco, California, US
- Ingo Mellinghoff, New York, New York, US
- Dattatraya Muzumdar, Mumbai, Maharashtra, India
- Brian V. Nahed, Boston, Massachusetts, US
- Masayuki Nitta, Tokyo, Japan
- Antonio Omuro, New York, New York, US
- Brian Patrick O'Neill, Rochester, Minnesota, US
- Edward Pan, Dallas, Texas, US
- Hung-Chuan Pan, Taichung, Taiwan
- Whitney Pope, Los Angeles, California, US
- Daniel Prevedello, Columbus, Ohio, US
- Stephen Price, Cambridge, UK
- Robert M. Prins, Los Angeles, California, US
- Raj K. Puri, Bethesda, Maryland, US
- Alfredo Quinones-Hinojosa, Jacksonville, Florida, US
- Prashant Raghavan, Baltimore, Maryland, US
- Guilherme C. Ribas, São Paulo, Brazil
- Patrick Roth, Zurich, Switzerland
- Raymond Sawaya, Houston, Texas, US
- Michael Schulder, Lake Success, New York, US
- Michael E. Sughrue, Oklahoma City, Oklahoma, US
- Tarik Tihan, San Francisco, California, US
- Daniel M. Trifiletti, Jacksonville, Florida, US
- Hiroaki Wakimoto, Boston, Massachusetts, US
- Ronald E. Warnick, Cincinnati, Ohio, US
- Katherine E. Warren, Bethesda, Maryland, US
- Howard L. Weiner, New York, New York, US
- Michael Weller, Zurich, Switzerland
- Max Wintermark, Stanford, California, US
- Anhua Wu, Shenyang, China
- Isaac Yang, Los Angeles, California, US
- William H. Yong, Los Angeles, California, US
- Daizo Yoshida, Tokyo, Japan
- Brad Evan Zacharia, Hershey, Pennsylvania, US
- Gabriel Zada, Los Angeles, California, US
- Jay-Jiguang Zhu, Houston, Texas, US

Editor emeritus:

- Joseph Piepmeier, New Haven, Connecticut, US

Social media editors:

- Gautam Mehta, Los Angeles, California, US
- Matthew Shepard, Charlottesville, Virginia, US
