= Journal of Clinical Neuroscience =

- Discipline: Medicine
- Language: English
- Edited by: Andrew H. Kaye

Publication details
- History: 1994-present
- Publisher: Churchill Livingstone
- Frequency: Bimonthly
- Impact factor: 2.116 (2021)

Standard abbreviations
- ISO 4: J. Clin. Neurosci.

Indexing
- ISSN: 0967-5868

Links
- Journal homepage

The Journal of Clinical Neuroscience is a bimonthly peer-reviewed medical journal covering the discipline of neurosurgery and neurology. It was established in 1994 and is published by the Elsevier imprint Churchill Livingstone. It is the official journal of the Asian Australasian Society of Neurological Surgeons. The editor-in-chief is Andrew H. Kaye.

The Journal of Clinical Neuroscience publishes articles on clinical neurosurgery and neurology and related neurosciences such as neuro-pathology, neuro-radiology, neuro-ophthalmology and neuro-physiology.
