= European Association of Neurosurgical Societies =

European Association of Neurosurgical Societies (EANS) is the continental, non-governmental, learned society representing the neurosurgeons of European region. It was founded in the year 1971. It is one of the 5 Continental Associations (AANS, AASNS, CAANS, EANS and FLANC) of the World Federation of Neurosurgical Societies (WFNS).
