= Louise Eisenhardt =

- Born: July 17, 1891; Ramsey, New Jersey
- Died: January 22, 1967 (aged 75)
- Education: Tufts medical school
- Occupation: Neuropathologist

Louise Eisenhardt (17 July 1891 – 22 January 1967) was one of the first neuropathologists and was considered leading world expert on tumor diagnosis. She became the first woman president of the American Association of Neurological Surgeons.

== Early life ==
Eisenhardt's parents were Albert Emil Eisenhardt of Königsberg, Prussia (now Kaliningrad, Russia) and Ella Knoll Eisenhardt. Her family was Protestant. She was born in Ramsey, New Jersey in 1891. She was hired in 1915 as an editorial assistant for Dr. Harvey Cushing. He encouraged her to go to medical school, and to continue to work for him while enrolled. Eisenhardt graduated from Tufts medical school in 1925, with the highest academic record ever attained there.

== Career ==
She did an internship at New England Hospital for women and children. Starting in 1922, she kept a log of operative tumors on various types of intracranial tumors ever treated by Cushing.

Eisenhardt rejoined Cushing as a neuropathologist after doing a residency for a year. She worked as his surgery associate from 1928 to 1934, and helped diagnose tumors and tissues that he operated on. She co-authored papers with him along with teaching psychopathology at Tufts.

In 1934, Eisenhardt moved with Cushing when he went from Harvard to Yale. Together they worked on a brain tumor registry with more than 2000 specimens. After Cushing died in 1938, Eisenhardt became the curator. She helped neurosurgeons around the world identify tumors and their treatments. The registry was also used to educate neuroscience students in the pathology of intracranial tumors.

Eisenhardt became the managing editor of Journal of Neurosurgery at its inception in 1944 and remained with the journal for 22 years. She was the first female president of the American Association of Neurological Surgeons, elected in 1938, and remained the only female president until Shelly Timmons, MD, PhD became president in 2018.
