= Asian Australasian Society of Neurological Surgeons =

Learned society for neurosurgeons

The Asian Australasian Society of Neurological Surgeons (AASNS) is the inter-continental, non-governmental, learned society representing neurosurgeons of the Asian-Australasian region. It was founded in 1964 and is made up of twenty-eight national societies, totaling 60 percent of neurosurgeons globally. It is the largest of the five continental associations (AANS, AASNS, CAANS, EANS and FLANC) of the World Federation of Neurosurgical Societies. The official journal of the society is the Journal of Clinical Neuroscience.

== Affiliated national societies ==
The following societies representing their respective country are constituents of AASNS:

- Neurosurgical Society of Australasia
- Bangladesh Society of Neurosurgeons
- Chinese Neurosurgical Society
- Chinese Congress of Neurological Surgeons
- Emirates Neuroscience Society
- Academy of Filipino Neurosurgeons
- Hong Kong Neurosurgical Society
- Neurosurgical Section of Neurological Society of India
- Indonesian Neurosurgical Society
- Israel Neurosurgical Society
- Japan Neurosurgical Society
- Japanese Congress of Neurological Surgeons
- Korean Neurosurgical Society
- Neurosurgical Association of Malaysia
- Nepalese Society of Neurosurgeon
- New Zealand Neurosurgical Society
- Saudi Association of Neurological Surgery
- Clinical Neuroscience Society of Singapore
- Taiwan Neurosurgical Society
- The Royal College of Neurological Surgeons of Thailand
- Uzbekistan Society of Neurosurgery
- Pan Arab Neurosurgical Society

== Past Presidents ==
List of the past presidents in chronological order:

- Douglas Miller
- Keiji Sano
- Udon Poshakrina
- Romeo Gustillo
- HL Wen
- J Geoffrey Toakley
- Kil Soo Choi
- Ching-Chang Hung
- Iftikhar Ali Raja
- Balaji Sadasivan
- Tetsuo Kanno
- Yong-Kwang TU
- Andrew Kaye
- Basant Misra
- Wan Tew Seow
