= James Rutka =

Canadian neurosurgeon (born 1956)

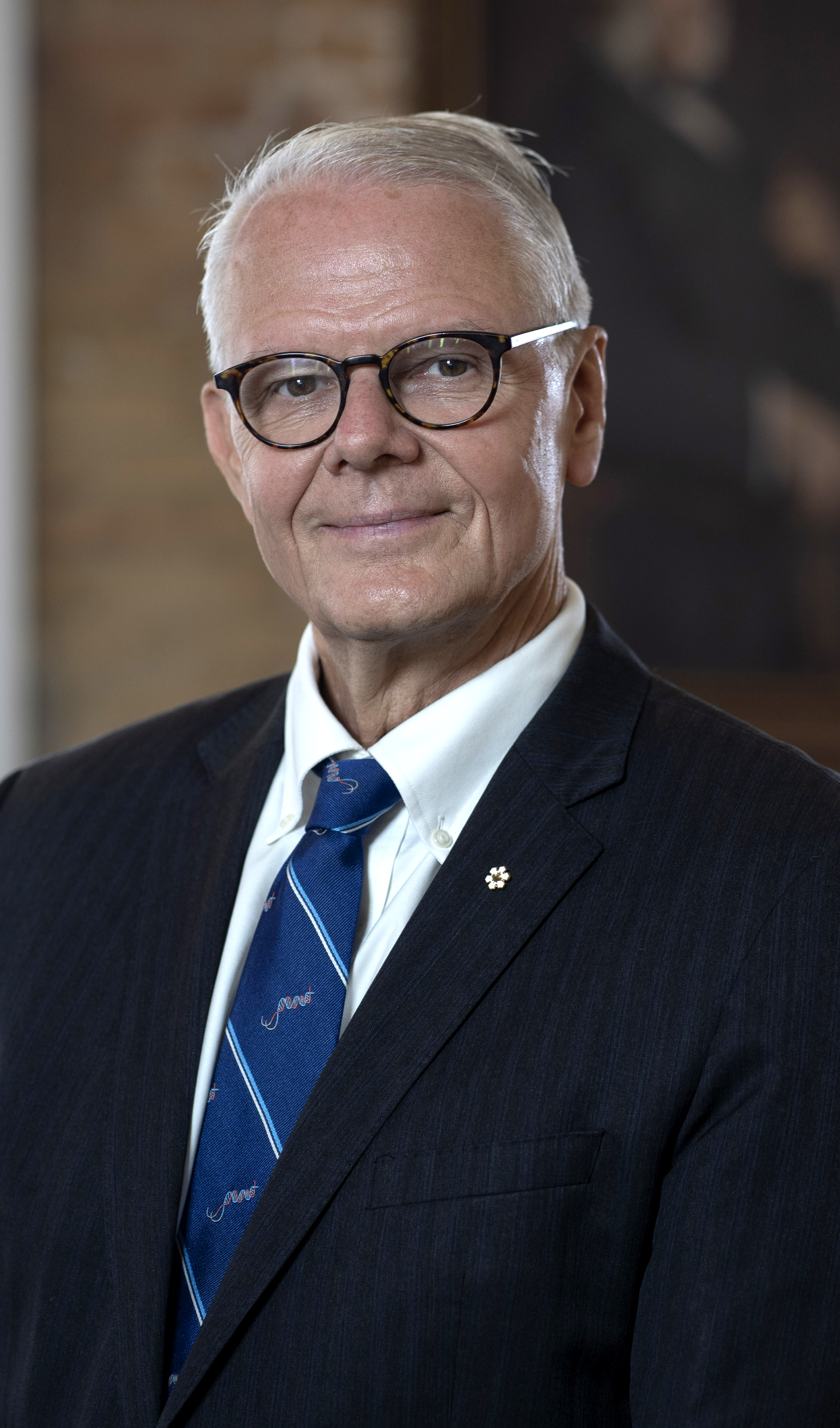
- Born: Toronto, Ontario, Canada
- Education: Princeton University, Queen's University (MD), McGill University (Internship), University of Toronto (Neurosurgery Residency), University of California San Francisco (PhD), University of Nagoya (Clinical Fellowship), Jutendo University (Post-doctoral Research Fellowship)
- Medical career
- Profession: Neurosurgeon
- Research: Brain Tumours, Astrocytoma, Medulloblastoma, Cell Biology, Genetics

James Rutka (born January 14, 1956) is a Canadian neurosurgeon from Toronto, Canada. Rutka served as RS McLaughlin Professor and Chair of the Department of Surgery in the Faculty of Medicine at the University of Toronto from 2011 – 2022. He subspecializes in pediatric neurosurgery at The Hospital for Sick Children (SickKids), and is a Senior Scientist in the Research Institute at SickKids. His main clinical interests include the neurosurgical treatment of children with brain tumours and epilepsy. His research interests lie in the molecular biology of human brain tumours – specifically in the determination of the mechanisms by which brain tumours grow and invade. He is the Director of the Arthur and Sonia Labatt Brain Tumour Research Centre at SickKids, and Editor-in-Chief of the Journal of Neurosurgery.

He was named an Officer of the Order of Canada in 2015.

== Education and training ==
Rutka was born in Toronto, Ontario, Canada. He studied Chemical Engineering at Princeton University before obtaining his Doctor of Medicine from Queen's University in 1981. Following an internship at McGill University's Royal Victoria Hospital in Montreal, Quebec, Rutka embarked on his neurosurgery residency training at the University of Toronto beginning in 1982. From 1984 to 1987, he undertook graduate studies at the University of California, San Francisco and worked in the Brain Tumour Research Centre. There, he received his PhD in Experimental Pathology from the School of Graduate Studies in 1987. Upon completion of his residency training in 1990 and receipt of certification in neurosurgery as a Fellow of the Royal College of Physicians and Surgeons of Canada (FRCSC), Rutka completed a clinical fellowship in microvascular neurosurgery with Kenichiro Sugita at Nagoya University followed by a post-doctoral research fellowship in molecular immunology under the supervision of Ko Okumura at Juntendo University in Tokyo in 1990.

== Professional life ==
Rutka joined the Department of Surgery in the Faculty of Medicine at the University of Toronto in 1990. He was appointed to Sick Kids Hospital, where he contributed to a variety of techniques to treat children with neurosurgical conditions. He also established the first brain tumour research laboratory at Sick Kids focusing on the molecular biology and genetics of paediatric and adult brain tumours. In 1997, and in collaboration with his colleagues in Toronto, Rutka was influential in establishing the Arthur and Sonia Labatt Brain Tumour Research Centre at Sick Kids, now one of the largest centres of its kind in the world. In 1999, Rutka was appointed Professor in Neurosurgery in the Department of Surgery, and the Dan Family Professor and Chair of the Division of Neurosurgery, a position he held until 2010. Currently, Rutka is the RS McLaughlin Chair of the Department of Surgery at the University of Toronto.

== Research and clinical interests ==
Rutka was a leader in his application of neurosurgical techniques to pediatric neurosurgical patients with a variety of neurosurgical disorders including craniofacial anomalies, brain tumours, congenital malformations, and epilepsy. With his colleagues, he helped introduce digital camera technology to assist with mapping of intra-operative seizure foci. He was among the first to utilize frameless stereotactic neuronavigation techniques to resect cerebral and skull base lesions in children; and he has amassed a large neurosurgical experience in treating children with epilepsy arising from lesions within highly eloquent and critical regions of the brain.

In addition, Rutka and colleagues have used magnetoencephalography (MEG) to identify regions of epileptogenesis amenable to neurosurgical resection.

Over the course of his research career, Rutka has made several contributions to the understanding of the molecular biology of human brain tumours. He has established several novel human brain tumour cell lines and models to study glioma invasion; he was among the first to characterize the role of the extracellular matrix (ECM) in the brain, and its degradation by proteolytic enzymes secreted by glioma cells; he has analyzed the importance of the Rho-GTPase pathway in glioma migration and invasion; and he has studied methods of delivering therapeutic agents across the blood-brain barrier to treat experimental brain tumours.

== Publications and editorships ==
Rutka has published over 650 peer-reviewed articles and book chapters on pediatric neurosurgery, the molecular biology of brain tumours, epilepsy surgery, and surgical education. In 2014, he was appointed as the 7th Editor-in-Chief of the Journal of Neurosurgery, and the first Canadian neurosurgeon to hold this position. He has co-edited several neurosurgical textbooks including Neuro-Oncology of CNS Tumors (2006).

== Sports ==
Rutka played numerous sports in high school and University. He set the Canadian midget triple jump record in 1972. In high school, he was drafted by the Peterborough Petes OHA Jr A hockey team, but chose instead to attend Princeton University to study chemical engineering. At Princeton, Rutka played varsity football and ran track and field. In medical school at Queen's University, Rutka was quarterback of the varsity football team that won the Vanier Cup in 1978 against the University of British Columbia.

https://www.youtube.com/watch?v=N0IUgmTD-rI

== Recognition ==
In 2004, Rutka received the Grass Award for sustained contributions in neurosurgical research from the Society of Neurological Surgeons. In 2006, he was inducted as a Knight of the Order of Smile, by Kawaler Orderu Usmiechu. In 2009, he was the Honored Guest Laureate for the Congress of Neurological Surgeons. Rutka delivered the Penfield Lecture at the 45th Annual Congress of the Canadian Neurological Sciences Federation in 2010. That same year, he was appointed as President of the American Association of Neurological Surgeons. In 2011, he was inducted as a fellow of the Royal Society of Canada. In 2012, Rutka was appointed as President of the American Academy of Neurological Surgery. In 2014, Rutka was made a Member of the Order of Ontario, and he received an honorary PhD, Honoris Causa, from Bahcesehir University in Istanbul for longstanding contributions to brain tumour research. In 2015, Rutka received the Robert L. Noble Prize from the Canadian Cancer Society, the Margolese National Brain Disorders Prize from the University of British Columbia, and he was made an Officer of the Order of Canada. In 2019, the American Association of Neurological Surgeons (AANS) awarded Dr. Rutka with the Cushing Medal: the most prestigious award an AANS member can receive. The Cushing Medal is awarded to a member who has shown great technical innovation in the development of new procedures that have changed the way diseases or trauma are treated. In 2020, Dr. Rutka received the Cross of Ivan Mazepa from the President of Ukraine, for longstanding contributions to humanitarian work in neurosurgery in Ukraine, particularly in Lviv and Kyiv. In 2022, Rutka received the AANS Distinguished Service Award, the World Federation of Neurosurgical Societies Medal of Honor, and the Golden Neuron Award from the World Academy of Neurological Surgery. In 2024 the Canadian Neurosurgical Society (CNSS) awarded Dr. Rutka the Lifetime Achievement Award (Charles Drake Medal), intended to recognize a senior neurosurgeon for their internationally recognized work in the field of neurosurgery and participation in the development of neurosurgical research and/or education in Canada. In 2026, Rutka was awarded the Medal of the Neurosurgical Society of America in Grand Cayman, Cayman Islands. In 2026, he was also appointed the inaugural Ellen Siow Endowed Professor of Neurosurgery at the National University of Singapore, a position he holds through 2029.

== Selected publications ==
- Rutka JT. Editorial: Leading transition while maintaining tradition. Journal of Neurosurgery. 2013 Jun 4
- Rutka JT (2011). "Discovering neurosurgery: New frontiers". Journal of Neurosurgery. 2011 (115): 1053–1066. doi:10.3171/2011.9.JNS111038. PMID 22132699.
