= Linda Liau =

American neurosurgeon

Linda M. Liau is an American neurosurgeon, neuroscientist, and the W. Eugene Stern Chair of the Department of Neurosurgery at the David Geffen School of Medicine at UCLA. Liau was elected to the Society of Neurological Surgeons in 2013 and the National Academy of Medicine in 2018. She has published over 230 research articles and a textbook, Brain Tumor Immunotherapy. She served as editor-in-chief of the Journal of Neuro-Oncology from 2007 to 2017.

== Early life and education ==
Liau was raised in Los Angeles, California. She received bachelor's degrees in biochemistry and political science from Brown University in 1987 and completed medical school at Stanford University in 1991. She also obtained a PhD in neuroscience in 1999 at UCLA, where she completed her residency and training in neurosurgery. She was inspired to pursue a career in neurosurgery after her mother died from breast cancer that had metastasized to her brain when Liau was in her third year of residency.

== Career and research ==
Liau is currently the chair of the Department of Neurosurgery at the David Geffen School of Medicine at UCLA, making her the second woman in the United States, and the first Asian-American woman, to chair an academic neurosurgical department.

Liau's primary research interest is the treatment of glioblastoma, a deadly form of brain cancer. Apart from surgical treatment, she has also worked on immunotherapy, and in the 1990s created one of the first personalized vaccines against brain cancer by using a sample of a patient's own tumor and white blood cells to activate an immune response against the cancer. She has since pioneered the use of dendritic cell-based vaccines in the treatment of glioblastoma. Other research she has performed includes the development of new techniques to map brain function during brain surgeries while the patient is awake.

== Personal life ==
Liau is married to Marvin Bergsneider, also a neurosurgeon at UCLA, with whom she has two children.
