= Latin American Federation of Neurosurgical Societies =

Latin American Federation of Neurosurgical Societies (FLANC) is the continental, non-governmental, learned society representing the neurosurgeons of Latin American region. It is one of the 5 Continental Associations (AANS, AASNS, CAANS, EANS and FLANC) of the World Federation of Neurosurgical Societies (WFNS).
