= Roy Glenwood Spurling =

American neurosurgeon

Roy Glenwood "Glen" Spurling (September 6, 1894 in Centralia, Missouri – February 7, 1968 in La Jolla, California) was an American neurosurgeon remembered for describing Spurling's test.

== Biography ==
R. Glen Spurling studied at the University of Missouri (B.A. 1920, M.A. 1923) and Harvard Medical School, receiving his M.D. with honours in 1923. He undertook his internship at Peter Bent Brigham Hospital under Harvey Cushing, who inspired him to practice neurosurgery. He became neurosurgical consultant to the Louisville General Hospital in 1925, during his surgical residency. He founded the neurosurgery service at the University of Louisville medical school in 1926, and remained in charge there until he retired in 1960. He formed the American Association of Neurological Surgeons in 1931, becoming president in 1934, and was one of the founder members, and later president, of the American Board of Neurological Surgery. He published Practical Neurological Diagnosis, with Special Reference to Problems of Neurosurgery in 1935. (The 3rd, 4th, 5th, and 6th editions were published in 1944, 1950, 1953, and 1960, respectively.)

During the Second World War he was the first Chief of Neurosurgery at the Walter Reed General Hospital and organised the neurosurgical service for the United States Army while serving as Assistant Chief of General Surgery. He was posted to London in March 1944 with responsibility for neurosurgery in the European theatre. While travelling home in 1945 he was summoned to return to France to attend General Patton, at the request of Patton's wife, after the car accident that caused Patton's death.

He became an editor of the Journal of Neurosurgery during the Second World War, and later became chairman of the editorial board, remaining an advisor until his death. He was awarded an honorary D.Sc. in 1957 by the University of Missouri, and was given the title Distinguished Professor of Neurological Surgery by the University of Louisville on his retirement.
