= Australian School of Advanced Medicine =

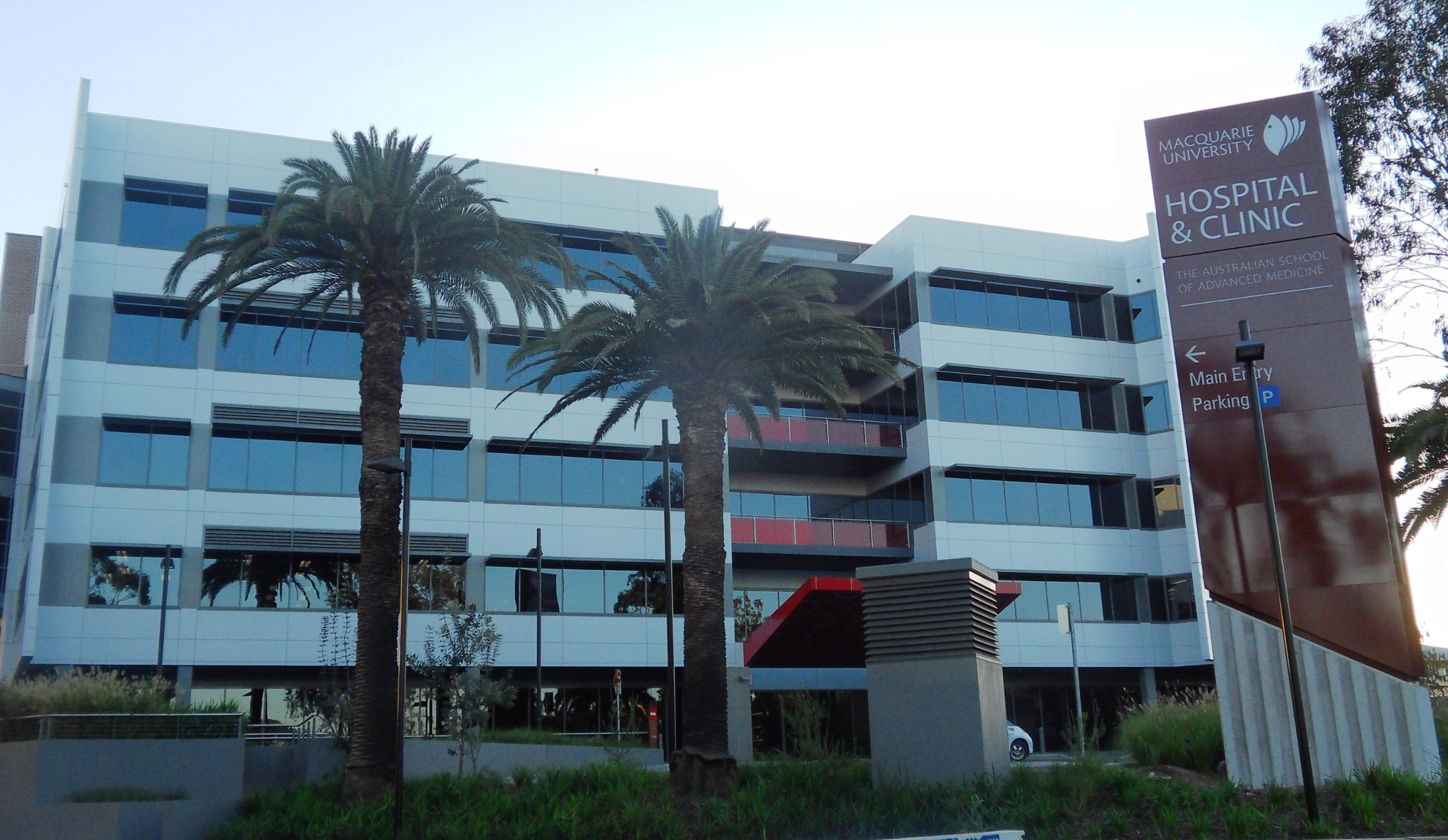
- Type: Public
- Established: 2007
- Affiliations: Macquarie University, Faculty of Human Sciences
- Dean: Professor Simon Foote
- Location: Sydney, New South Wales, Australia; 33°46′23″S 151°7′4″E
- Campus: Urban
- Website: www.medicine.mq.edu.au

The Australian School of Advanced Medicine is the first and only medical school in Australia to award degrees for sub-specialties in surgery in addition to PhD research opportunities for doctors.

The school is based within the University Clinic Building adjacent and connected to the Macquarie University Hospital.

The school has used successful teaching hospitals (particularly Johns Hopkins and the Mayo Clinic) as models for its development and operations.

The Australian School of Advanced Medicine is also a designated Concentration of Research Excellence (CORE) at Macquarie University in neuroscience, vascular science and surgery.

== Medical Programs ==
The Australian School of Advanced Medicine offers degrees in:

- Master of Surgery (MSurg)
- Master of Advanced Surgery (MASurg)
- Master of Advanced Medicine (MAMed)
- Master of Medical Practice in Hospital Medical Care (MMedPrac)
- Master of Higher Education in Medical Education (MHEd)

The School also offers research degrees in:

- Master of Philosophy (MPhil)
- Doctor of Philosophy (PhD).

The Australian School of Advanced Medicine is also a designated Concentration of Research Excellence (CORE) at Macquarie University in neuroscience, vascular science and surgery.

== Notable faculty ==
- B. K. Misra - Neurosurgeon
