= Regional Institute of Education, Bhubaneswar =

College in Bhubaneswar, Odisha, India

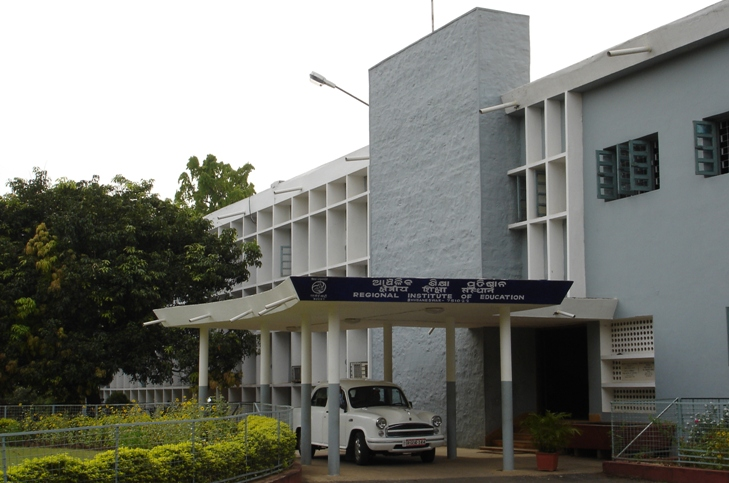
- Former name: Regional College of Education[RCE]
- Motto: Come to learn and go to serve
- Type: Govt. Funded
- Established: 1963
- Affiliations: Utkal University
- Principal: Prof. Manasi Goswami
- Location: Bhubaneswar, Odisha, India; 20°17′20″N 85°49′57″E
- Campus: Urban
- Website: www.riebbs.ac.in

Regional Institute of Education, Bhubaneswar is a constituent unit of National Council of Educational Research and Training, New Delhi, caters to the educational needs of teachers of Eastern Indian region. It provides academic and technical support to the state of Odisha, West Bengal, Bihar, Jharkhand and Andaman and Nicobar Islands. The institute act as a regional resource centre for all areas of education, especially school education. UNESCO Bangkok has declared Regional Institute of Education, Bhubaneswar as a resource centre for ICT.

== Departments ==
=== Department of Education ===
1. Educational Technology
2. Special Education
3. Physical Education
4. Psychology Laboratory

=== Department of Education in Science & Mathematics ===
1. Physics
2. Chemistry
3. Mathematics
4. Botany
5. Zoology
6. Agriculture
7. Teaching Learning Aids Center / SUPW Cell
8. Population Education Cell

=== Department of Education in Social Science & Humanities ===
1. Hindi
2. English
3. Odia
4. Bengali
5. Geography
6. History
7. Political Science
8. Economics

=== Demonstration Multipurpose School ===
The Demonstration Multipurpose School is an integral part of Regional Institute of Education, Bhubaneswar and act as a laboratory for trying out innovative practices in school education and teacher education. The school is affiliated to the Central Board of Secondary Education, New Delhi. It imparts education from classes 1 to 12 in English medium.

== Courses ==
- 4 year integrated B.Sc. B.Ed
- 4 year integrated B.A. B.Ed
- 2 year B.Ed.(Arts & Science)
- 2 year M.Ed.
- 1 year M.Phil.(Education)
- DCGC
- Pre-Ph.D.[Education]

== Library ==
The institute's library has more than 70,000 documents, which includes about 59,000 books, 1000 bound volumes of periodicals, 300 reports, 580 dissertations, 100 maps. It subscribes around 77 Indian and foreign journals and 16 daily newspapers every year. An average of 550 new books are being added to the library in each year.

== Laboratory ==
The institute has three chemistry laboratories, two physics laboratories and one dark room for optical experiments. The institute also houses one lab each for botany and zoology. The labs are well equipped with sufficient number of apparatuses and modern electronic devices. There is also a biological museum which puts into display a number of biological specimens. There are also two computer laboratories and one state-of-the-art ICT studio.

== Hostel ==
The institute has hostel facilities too, well within its campus. The names of the hostels operated by the Institute are, viz.,

- Homibhaba Hostel (for boys)
- Gopabandhu Hostel (for girls)
- Ramanujan Hostel (for boys)
- Ashutosh Hostel (for girls)
- Sarojini Hostel (for guests)
- Laxmibai Hostel (for girls)

== Photo gallery ==
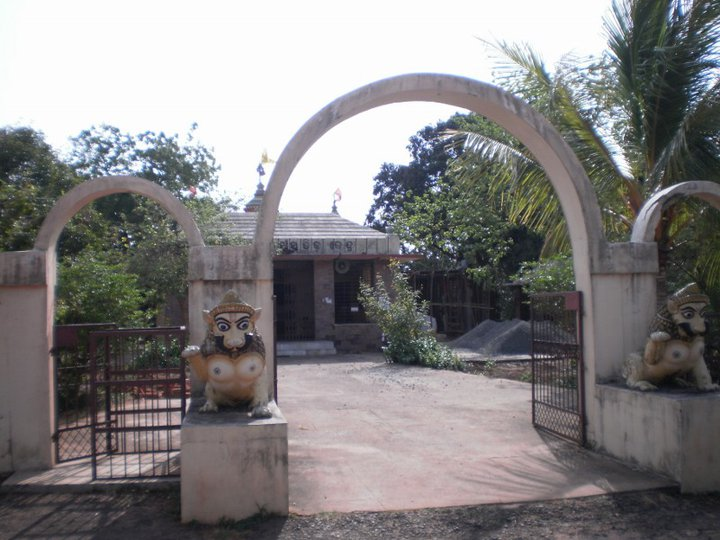
Campus Temple

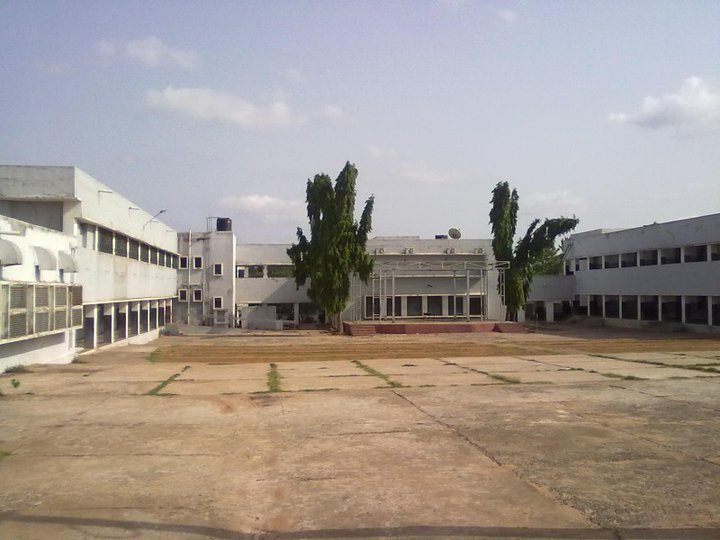
Assembly Ground

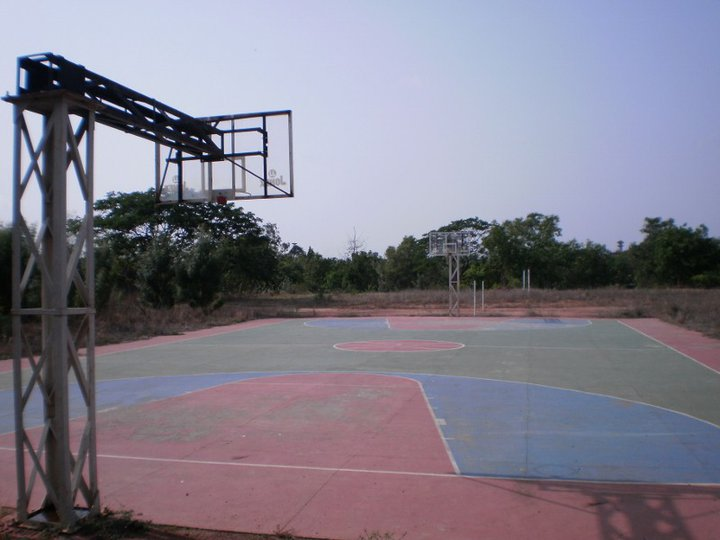
Basketball field

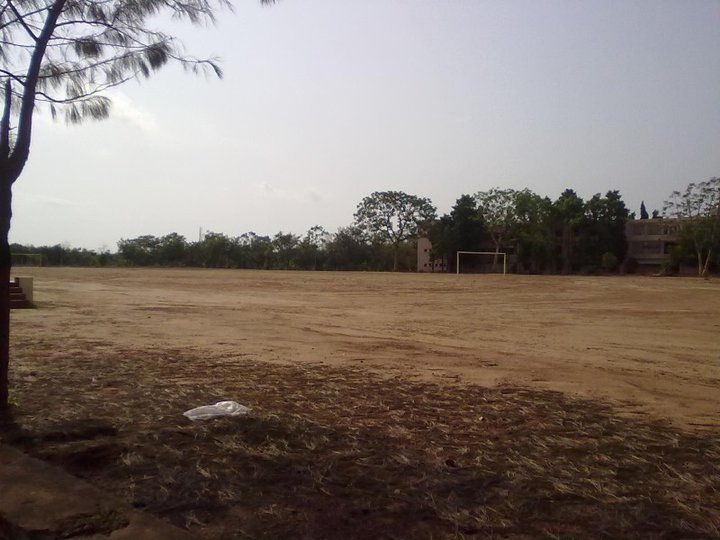
Main Athletic Complex
