= Acta Neurochirurgica =

- Discipline: Neurosurgery
- Language: English
- Edited by: T. Mathiesen

Publication details
- History: 1950-present
- Publisher: Springer Science+Business Media
- Frequency: Monthly
- Open access: Hybrid
- Impact factor: 2.216 (2020)

Standard abbreviations
- ISO 4: Acta Neurochir.
- NLM: Acta Neurochir (Wien)

Indexing
- CODEN: ACNUA5
- ISSN: 0001-6268 (print); 0942-0940 (web)
- LCCN: sf89010701
- OCLC no.: 1056456847

Links
- Journal homepage; Online archive

Acta Neurochirurgica is a monthly peer-reviewed medical journal covering all aspects of neurosurgery. It was established in 1950 and is published by Springer Science+Business Media. The editor-in-chief is T. Mathiesen (University of Copenhagen).

== Abstracting and indexing ==
The journal is abstracted and indexed in:

- Biological Abstracts
- BIOSIS Previews
- Current Contents/Clinical Medicine
- EBSCO databases
- Embase
- Index Medicus/MEDLINE/PubMed
- ProQuest databases
- Science Citation Index
- Scopus

According to the Journal Citation Reports, the journal has a 2020 impact factor of 2.216.
