= Leo M. Davidoff =

American academic

Leo M. Davidoff (January 16, 1898 – December 25, 1975) was a professor, associate dean and chairman of the departments of surgery and neurological surgery at the Albert Einstein College of Medicine in New York City. He earned his MD from Harvard Medical School.

== Honours and awards ==
=== Foreign honours ===
- Czechoslovakia: Officer of the Order of the White Lion (1946)
