= Continental Association of African Neurosurgical Societies =

International organization representing African neuroscientists

- Abbreviation: CAANS
- Type: Non-governmental societies
- Legal status: Learned society
- Members: African neurological society
- Parent organization: World Federation of Neurosurgical Societies

The Continental Association of African Neurosurgical Societies (CAANS) is the continental, non-governmental, learned society representing the neurosurgeons of African region. It is one of the 5 Continental Associations (AANS, AASNS, CAANS, EANS and FLANC) of the World Federation of Neurosurgical Societies (WFNS).
