= Psychomotor patterning =

Pseudoscientific treatment

Psychomotor patterning, rarely referred to as the Doman-Delacato technique, is a pseudoscientific approach to the treatment of intellectual disabilities, brain injury, learning disabilities, and other cognitive diseases. The treatment is based on the largely-discredited theory of recapitulation.

The method assumes that intellectual disabilities result from the failure of an individual to develop properly through the phylogenetic stages, and treatment primarily focuses on non-invasive physical therapy in each of the stages. In one such stage, the homolateral stage, a healthy child typically crawls by turning the head to one side while extending the arm and leg of the opposite side. The patterning treatment is applied to those unable to perform this motion, and involves passive intervention by 4-5 adults who assists the child in an effort to impose or induce the proper pattern onto the central nervous system.

The therapy normally lasts for 5 minutes and is repeated at least 4 times a day. Full treatment programs typically contain a range of exercises combined with sensory stimulation, breathing exercises designed to increase oxygen flow to the brain, and systematic restriction and facilitation designed to promote hemispheric dominance.

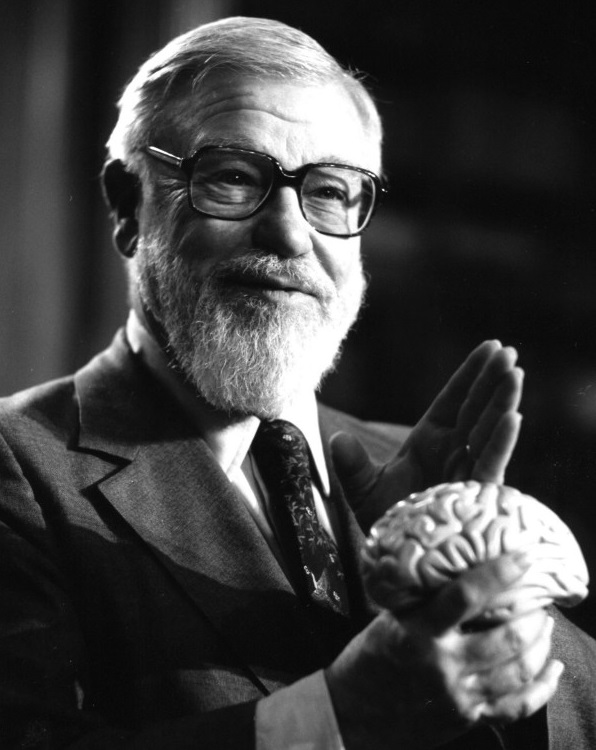
Glenn Doman 1919-2013

The treatment modality of patterning was developed in the 1960s by Glenn Doman and Carl Delacato.

== See also ==
- The Institutes for the Achievement of Human Potential
