= Institutes for the Achievement of Human Potential =

American non-profit organization

The Institutes for the Achievement of Human Potential
- Abbreviation: IAHP
- Formation: 1955
- Founder: Glenn Doman
- Type: Non-profit Organization
- Headquarters: Philadelphia, Pennsylvania, U.S.
- Region served: Worldwide
- Director: Janet Doman
- Website: iahp.org

The Institutes for The Achievement of Human Potential (IAHP) is an American non-profit organization. It was founded in 1955 by Glenn Doman and Carl Delacato to provide literature on and teach a controversial patterning therapy, known as motor learning, which the Institutes promote as improving the "neurologic organization" of "brain injured" and mentally disabled children through a variety of programs, including diet and exercise. The Institutes also provides extensive early-learning programs for "well" children, including programs focused on reading, mathematics, language, and physical fitness. It is headquartered in Philadelphia, with offices and programs offered in several other countries.

Pattern therapy for patients with neuromuscular disorders was first developed by neurosurgeon Temple Fay in the 1940s. Patterning has been widely criticized and multiple studies have found the therapy ineffective.

== History ==
The Institutes for the Achievement of Human Potential (IAHP, also known as "The Institutes") was founded in 1955. It practices pattern therapy, which was developed by Doman and educational psychologist Carl Delacato. Pattern therapy drew upon the ideas and work of ideas of neurophysiologist Temple Fay, former head of the Department of Neurosurgery at Temple University School of Medicine and president of the Philadelphia Neurological Society.

In 1960, Doman and Delacato published an article in the Journal of the American Medical Association (JAMA) detailing pattern therapy. The methodology of their study was later criticized.

== Philosophy ==
The philosophy of the Institutes consists of several interrelated beliefs: that every child has genius potential, stimulation is the key to unlocking a child's potential, teaching should commence at birth, the younger the child, the easier the learning process, children naturally love to learn, parents are their child's best teacher, teaching and learning should be joyous and teaching and learning should never involve testing. This philosophy follows very closely to the Japanese Suzuki method for violin, which is also taught at the institute in addition to the Japanese language itself. The Institutes consider brain damage, intellectual impairment, "mental deficiency", cerebral palsy, epilepsy, autism, athetosis, attention deficit hyperactivity disorder, "developmental delay", and Down syndrome as conditions encompassing "brain injury", the term favored by IAHP.

Much of the work at The Institutes follows from Dr. Temple Fay who believed in recapitulation theory, which posits that the infant brain evolves through chronological stages of development similar to first a fish, a reptile, a mammal and finally a human. This theory can be encapsulated as "ontogeny recapitulates phylogeny". Recapitulation theory has been largely discredited in biology.

According to a 2007 WPVI-TV report, IAHP uses the word "hurt" to describe the children they see "with all kinds of brain injuries and conditions, including cerebral palsy, mental retardation, epilepsy, Down's syndrome, attention deficit hyperactivity disorder, and autism". Glenn Doman described his own personal philosophy for treating patients as stemming from his WWII veteran officer motto: "Leave no injured behind."

== Programs ==
=== Programs for brain-injured children ===
IAHP's program begins with a five-day seminar for the parents of "brain injured" children, because the program is carried out by parents at their homes. Following the seminar, IAHP conducts an initial evaluation of the child.

The program described in the 1960 JAMA paper (Doman, et al.) for "brain-injured" children included:

- Patterning – manipulation of limbs and head in a rhythmic fashion
- Crawling – forward bodily movement with the abdomen in contact with the floor
- Creeping – forward bodily movement with the abdomen raised from the floor
- Receptive stimulation – visual, tactile and auditory stimulation
- Expressive activities – e.g. picking up objects
- Masking – breathing into a rebreathing mask to increase the amount of carbon dioxide inhaled, which is purported to increase cerebral blood flow
- Brachiation – swinging from a bar or vertical ladder
- Gravity/Antigravity activities – rolling, somersaulting and hanging upside down.

The IAHP holds that brain injury at a given level of neurological development prevents or slows further progress.

Other therapies utilized by IAHP include eye exercises for children who have an eye that converges more than the other when looking at an object in the distance and those who have one eye that diverges more than the other when an object is moved slowly toward the bridge of the nose. IAHP also recommends stimulating the eyes of children with amblyopia by flashing a light on and off. For children with poor hearing, IAHP recommends auditory stimulation with loud noises, which may be pre-recorded. Brain-injured children may also be taught to identify by touch alone various objects placed in a bag.

IAHP recommends dietary restrictions, including reduced fluid intake for brain-injured children in an attempt to prevent "the possible overaccumulation of cerebrospinal fluid". Alongside fluid restriction, IAHP recommends a diet low in salt, sweets, and other "thirst provoking" foods.

== Scientific evaluation and criticism ==
The Institutes model of childhood development has been criticized in the scientific community.

=== American Academy of Pediatrics position statement ===
According to the American Academy of Pediatrics, patterning treatment is based on an oversimplified theory of brain development and its effectiveness is not supported by evidence-based medicine, making its use unwarranted. The American Academy of Pediatrics Committee on Children With Disabilities issued warnings regarding patterning, one of the IAHP's therapies for brain injured children, as early as 1968 and repeated in 1982. Their latest cautionary policy statement was in 1999, which was reaffirmed in 2010 states:

This treatment is based on an outmoded and oversimplified theory of brain development. Current information does not support the claims of proponents that this treatment is efficacious, and its use continues to be unwarranted.... [T]he demands and expectations placed on families are so great that in some cases their financial resources may be depleted substantially and parental and sibling relationships could be stressed.

=== Others ===
In addition to the American Academy of Pediatrics, a number of other organizations have issued cautionary statements about claims for efficacy of this therapy. These include the executive committee of the American Academy for Cerebral Palsy, the United Cerebral Palsy Association of Texas, the Canadian Association for Retarded Children, the executive board of the American Academy of Neurology, and the American Academy of Physical Medicine and Rehabilitation. Hornby et al. call R.A. Cummins 1988 book The Neurologically Impaired-child: Doman-Delacato Techniques Reappraised (Croom Helm, ISBN 978-0-7099-4859-9), "The most comprehensive analysis of the rationale and effectiveness of the Doman-Delacato programme to date" and state Cummins uses neuroanatomy and neurophysiology to demonstrate that there is no sound scientific basis for the techniques used by the IAHP and concludes any benefit is likely due to increased activity and attention. Hornby et al. conclude, "It is now clear that the only results supporting the effectiveness of the programme come from a handful of early, poorly controlled studies." Kavale and Mostert and others also identified serious problems with the early research on the IAHP program. An analysis of higher quality studies found that students not receiving the treatment had better outcomes than those who were treated by the IAHP. A 2013 study found the claims of superior results of treatment by the IAHP were not substantiated.

A 2006 retrospective study of 21 children with cortical visual impairment conducted by researchers from the IAHP, Lehigh University and University of Haifa found significant improvement after use of the program. Rather than an internal control group, the study compared outcomes to a similar external retrospective study of children by Hoyt et al. (2003), in which "patients received no visual stimulation programs but were seen for at least two evaluations."

Martha Farrell Erickson, PhD, and Karen Marie Kurz-Riemer, MEd, wrote that the Better Baby Institute, which is now part of IAHP, "capitalized on the desires of members of the 'baby boom' generation to maximize their children's intellectual potential" and "encouraged parents to push their infants to develop maximum brain power." They wrote, "Among his most often-discussed and controversial methods was to expose infants as young as 3 months to flashcards with pictures of letters, numbers, shapes, colors, and even famous historical figures and works of art." They continued, "there were no published studies of the program’s effectiveness and most child development experts at the time described many aspects of the program as useless and perhaps even harmful."

Kathleen Quill concluded that "professionals" have nothing to learn from pattern therapy. Pavone and Ruggieri have written that pattern therapy does not have an important role in treatment. Neurologist Steven Novella has characterized pattern therapy as being based on a discarded theory and a "false cure". He also wrote that IAHP's unsubstantiated claims can cause both financial and emotional damage. While detailing criticism of pattern therapy, Robards also wrote that the therapy caused pediatricians and therapists to recognize that early intervention programs are necessary.

The American Academy of Pediatrics and other organizations have criticized the IAHP's claims of effectiveness, theoretical basis and the demands placed on parents by IAHP programs. Early studies originating from IAHP appeared to show some value of their program but were later criticized as significantly flawed. Kenneth Kavale and Mark Mostert have written that later studies they believe to have better design and more objectivity have shown pattern therapy "to be practically without merit".

In their book Controversial Issues in Special Education, Garry Hornby, Jean Howard and Mary Atkinson state the program also includes "gagging" in which the child breathes into a plastic bag until gasping for breath. This is based on the belief that it will cause maximum use of the lungs and thus maximize oxygen circulation to the brain. The book concludes that pattern therapy is ineffective and potentially damaging to the functioning of families.

=== Attitude to scientific evaluation ===
In the 1960s, IAHP published literature that appeared to demonstrate the effectiveness of the program. However, they subsequently instructed parents of children in their program not to take part in any independent studies designed to evaluate the program's effectiveness. The IAHP withdrew its agreement to participate in a "carefully designed study supported by federal and private agencies" when the study was in its final planning stages. According to Herman Spitz, "The IAHP no longer appears to be interested in a scientific evaluation of their techniques; they have grown large, wealthy, and independent, and their staff is satisfied to provide case histories and propaganda tracts in support of their claims." Terrence M. Hines then stated that they "have shown very little interest in providing empirical support for their methods".
