= Steven Brem =

American neurosurgeon

Steven Brem is an American neurosurgeon at the Perelman School of Medicine at the University of Pennsylvania. He graduated from Harvard School of Medicine and completed his residency at Massachusetts General Hospital.

== Glioma Surgery ==
Brem authored the comprehensive glioblastoma textbook "Glioblastoma".
