= World Federation of Neurosurgical Societies =

Leading group of brain repair physicians

- Formation: 1955
- Type: Professional association
- Headquarters: 1260 Nyon, Vaud, Switzerland
- Region served: Worldwide
- Members: Represents 50,000 neurosurgeons
- President: Najia El Abbadi
- Vice-President: Miguel A. Arraez
- Website: wfns.org

The World Federation of Neurosurgical Societies (WFNS), founded in 1955, in Switzerland, as a professional, scientific, non governmental organization, is composed of 130 member societies: consisting of 5 Continental Associations (AANS, AASNS, CAANS, EANS and FLANC), 6 Affiliate Societies, and 119 National Neurosurgical Societies, representing some 50,000 neurosurgeons worldwide. It has a consultative status in the United Nations. The official Journal of the Organization is World Neurosurgery.

== Objectives and mission statement ==
The World Federation of Neurosurgical Societies aspires to promote global improvement in neurosurgical care. The mission of the World Federation of Neurosurgical Societies (WFNS) is to work together with their member learned societies to improve worldwide neurosurgical care, training and research to benefit their patients.

== History ==
The 50 year history of the society has been recorded verbatim by the WFNS historian. The record shows that despite steady progress and adjustments, at times heated arguments took place at officials meetings, as to goals, direction, finances, membership, etc., and the discussions at times have been rancorous. Nevertheless, the society has grown and continues to grow.

== See also ==
- World Federation of Neurology
