= American Association of Neurological Surgeons =

Scientific and educational association

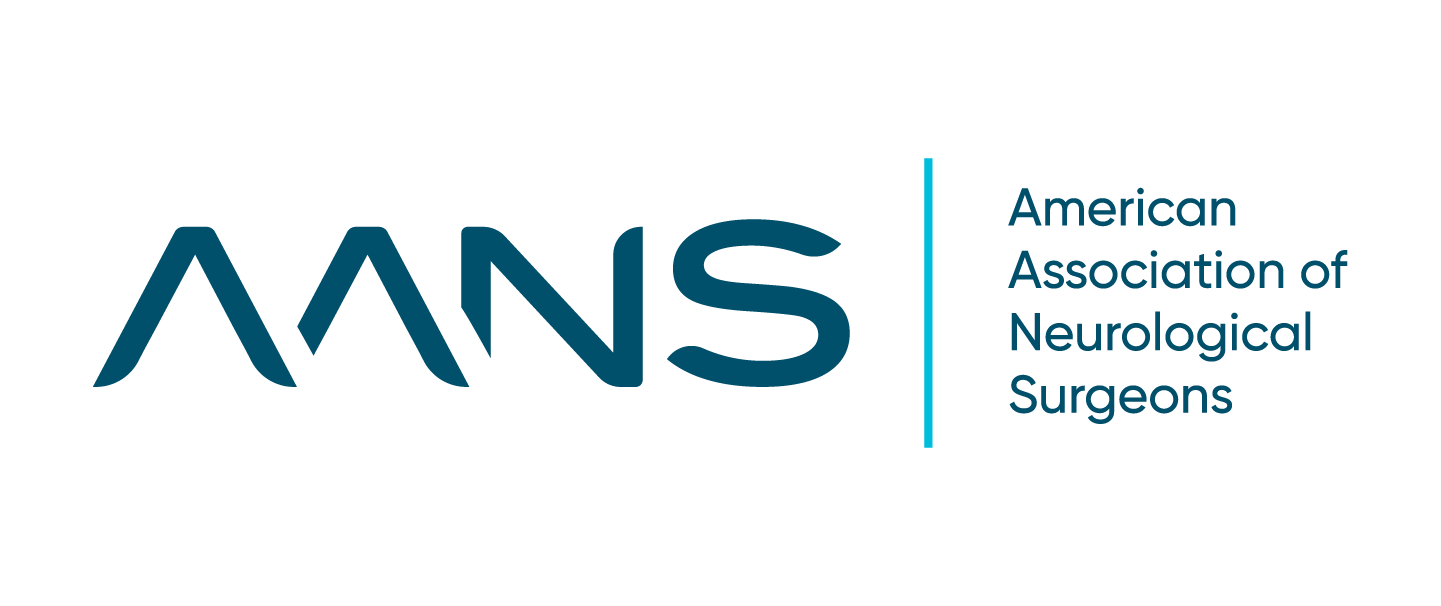
- Abbreviation: AANS
- Formation: 1931
- Type: Professional association
- Headquarters: Rolling Meadows, Illinois
- Region served: Worldwide
- Members: 12,000
- President: E. Sander Connolly, Jr.
- CEO: Katie O. Orrico
- Website: www.aans.org

The American Association of Neurological Surgeons (AANS) is a professional organization focused on advancing the specialty of neurological surgery. Founded in 1931, the AANS serves a membership of over 12,000 professionals worldwide, including neurosurgeons, medical students and allied health professionals. It is one of the five Continental Associations of the World Federation of Neurosurgical Societies (WFNS), the other four being the AASNS, CAANS, EANS and FLANC.

== History ==
Attendees at the first meeting of the Harvey Cushing Society in Boston, 1932.

Founded in 1931, the AANS was originally known as the Harvey Cushing Society, named for the brain surgery pioneer Harvey Cushing. The creation of the society was spurred initially by R. Glen Spurling and William P. Van Wagenen who, with Cushing, acknowledged the need for a venue in which younger neurosurgeons could exchange ideas on the specialty. Membership to the Society of Neurological Surgeons, the specialty's key organization during this period, was closed to younger men at this time. Spurling and Van Wagenen enlisted the help of Temple Fay and R. Eustace Semmes in the creation of the group, and on May 6, 1932, the Harvey Cushing Society held its first meeting in Boston. Twenty-three people attended, many of whom were Cushing's colleagues and neurosurgical trainees.

Other charter members of the society were Gilbert Anderson, Paul C. Bucy, W. Edward Chamberlain, Leo M. Davidoff, Louise Eisenhardt, Edgar Fincher, John F. Fulton, W. James Gardner, William J. German, Franc D. Ingraham, Franklin Jelsma, Edgar Kahn, Roland Klemme, James G. Lyerly Sr., Eric Oldberg, Tracy Putnam, Frederic Schreiber, Merril C. Sosman, and Frank R. Teachenor.

The association was later renamed what it remains today: “The American Association of Neurological Surgeons,” to reflect its broader membership and mission.

=== Significant dates ===
- 1942 – The AANS adopts new bylaws requiring active members to be certified by the American Board of Neurological Surgery (ABNS).
- 1944 – The first issue of the Journal of Neurosurgery is printed. An editorial board had been established in 1943, and Louise Eisenhardt was named editor-in-chief.
- 1967 – At its annual meeting in San Francisco, the Harvey Cushing Society changes its name to the American Association of Neurological Surgeons (AANS). The group also revamps its membership requirements, now noting that only board-certified neurosurgeons could be considered for active membership. Associate memberships are available for those in related neurological disciplines. This same year, the William P. Van Wagenen Fellowship is established to provide educational funding to medical students.
- 1969 – The association observes the 100-year anniversary of Harvey Cushing's birth by holding its annual meeting in his birthplace of Cleveland and issuing a commemorative stamp via the United States Postal Service.
- 1976 – A headquarters office is established in downtown Chicago. The office moves to Park Ridge, Illinois in 1984, and subsequently to its current location in Rolling Meadows, Illinois in 2000.
- 1988 – The United States Postal Service issues an official Harvey Cushing stamp on June 17 as part of its "Great Americans" 45-cent stamp collection.

== Membership ==
The AANS is composed of board-certified neurosurgeons from around the world as well as medical students, neurosurgical support staff, and physicians in associated fields of practice.

== Legislative advocacy ==
Throughout its history, the AANS has taken stances on legislative issues affecting neurosurgical professionals and their patients. Efforts include patient safety and quality improvement, tort reform, and issues relating to the Emergency Medical Treatment and Active Labor Act. In addition to a professional staff office in Washington, D.C., the AANS maintains a member-driven Washington Committee to advocate for a number of causes. Washington staff maintains the Neurosurgery Blog which highlights the latest legislative activities affecting health care and the neurosurgical specialty.

== Publications ==
Since 1944, the AANS has published the Journal of Neurosurgery. In addition, the quarterly AANS Neurosurgeon focuses on "issues related to legislation, workforce and practice management." Each issue is centered on different themes, and past themes include humanitarian neurosurgery, neurosurgeons as patients, stereotactic radiosurgery, and neurovascular neurosurgery.

== Patient information and public outreach ==
The AANS offers resources on its website to education patients about neurosurgical conditions and treatments. Every August, the AANS organizes Neurosurgery Awareness Month, this initiative aims to promote neurological safety and increase public understanding of critical neurosurgical conditions, including stroke prevention and treatment.

== Education ==
The AANS offers its members a number of educational opportunities, mostly through courses held around the country at various times of the year. Topics include practice management, oral board preparation, maintenance of certification, and resident education. Course offerings also extend to mid-level practitioners such as nurses and physician assistants.

== Annual meeting ==
The AANS has held an Annual Scientific Meeting every year since its 1932 inception except twice; in 1945 due to World War II, and in 2020 due to the COVID-19 pandemic. The 2021 meeting was exclusively virtual, also due to the pandemic.

Programming includes presentations of neurological studies, seminars, workshops for practitioners at all levels, and keynote speeches. Past speakers include H. Ross Perot (1987), Colin Powell (1995), George H. W. Bush (1999), Tom Brokaw (2001), Benazir Bhutto (2002), Henry Kissinger (2003), Ken Burns (2004), Walter Isaacson (2013), and Chesley Sullenberger (2013).

== Neurosurgical Research and Education Foundation ==
Established by the AANS in 1981, the Neurosurgery Research and Education Foundation (NREF) provides funding for training in the neurosciences and support for career neurosurgeons. Through grants and awards, it supports medical students, residents and young neurosurgical faculty in conducting basic science, patient-oriented, clinical and outcomes research, as well as outcomes studies that protect and support neurosurgical procedures for all practicing neurosurgeons. It also funds North American and international fellowships in all neurosurgical subspecialties.

The NREF supported the founding of NeurosurGen Inc., a nonprofit project established in 2022 to document the academic genealogy of neurosurgeons. The initiative compiles data on neurosurgical training lineages, including information such as residency completion dates, program directors, and chairpersons at the time of graduation, and uses this to create an academic family tree.

== Neuropoint Alliance ==
As an effort led by the AANS with cooperation of other organized neurological associations, the Neuropoint Alliance was founded in 2008 to collect, analyze, and report clinical data from neurosurgical practices. Services include clinical trial management, study design, and survey facilitation. Its first nationwide effort was the National Neurosurgery Quality and Outcomes Database.

== Notable AANS award winners ==
The AANS presents several major awards each year during the AANS Annual Scientific Meeting, honoring the lifetime contribution of members for their surgical, scientific and humanitarian accomplishments.

=== Cushing Medal ===
- 2017 Robert F. Spetzler
- 2019 James T. Rutka
- 2022 William T. Couldwell

=== AANS Cushing Award for Technical Excellence and Innovation in Neurosurgery ===
- 2023 Michael T. Lawton
