= Journal of Neurosurgery =

- Discipline: Neurosurgery
- Language: English
- Edited by: James Rutka

Publication details
- History: 1944–present
- Publisher: American Association of Neurological Surgeons (United States)
- Frequency: Monthly
- Open access: Delayed, after 12 months
- Impact factor: 3.8 (2025)

Standard abbreviations
- ISO 4: J. Neurosurg.

Indexing
- CODEN: JONSAC
- ISSN: 0022-3085 (print); 1933-0693 (web)
- OCLC no.: 682133081

Links
- Journal homepage

The Journal of Neurosurgery (the JNS) is a monthly peer-reviewed medical journal covering all aspects of neurosurgery. It is published by the American Association of Neurological Surgeons and the editor-in-chief is James Rutka. It was established in 1944, with Louise Eisenhardt as founding editor. Originally published bimonthly, it switched to a monthly schedule in 1962. All content is freely available online after 12 months, until it is 10 years old. According to the Journal Citation Reports, the journal has a 2025 impact factor of 3.8.

== Editors-in-chief ==
The following persons are or have been editors-in-chief of the journal:

- Fred G. Barker II (2026-Present)
- James Rutka (2013–2025)
- John A. Jane (1992–2013)
- Thoralf Sundt Jr. (1989–1992)
- William Collins Jr. (1985–1989)
- Henry Schwartz (1975–1985)
- Henry Heyl (1965–1975)
- Louise Eisenhardt (1944–1965)

== The Journal of Neurosurgery Publishing Group ==
The Journal of Neurosurgery Publishing Group also publishes:

- Journal of Neurosurgery: Spine, established in 1999, it is an independent journal since 2004
- Journal of Neurosurgery: Pediatrics, established in 2004, it is an independent journal since January 2008
- Neurosurgical Focus, published monthly since 1996, it is curated by expert guest editors and is free to the public
