= Right to keep and bear arms =

Right of citizens to possess weapons

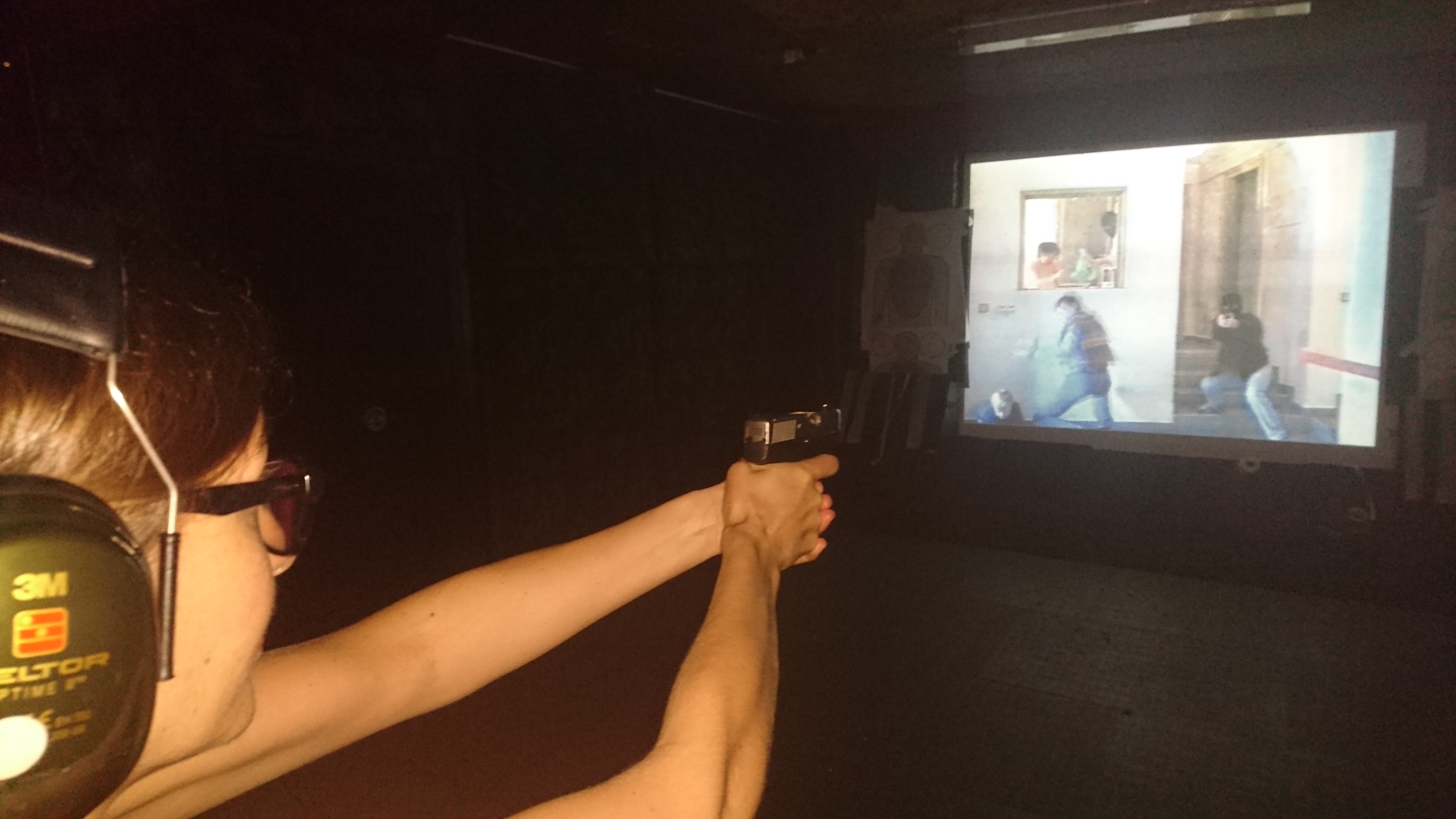
A woman trains real-life defensive gun use scenarios with live ammunition at a video shooting range in Prague, Czech Republic in 2018

The right to keep and bear arms (often referred to as the right to bear arms) is a right for people to possess weapons (arms) for the preservation of life, liberty, and property. The purpose of gun rights is for self-defense, as well as hunting and sporting activities. Countries that guarantee a right to keep and bear arms include the Czech Republic, Guatemala, Mexico, Switzerland, the United States, Algeria and Yemen.

== Background ==
The English Bill of Rights 1689, passed in the aftermath of the Glorious Revolution which overthrew the Catholic King James II, allows Protestant citizens of England and Wales to "have Arms for their Defence suitable to their Conditions and as allowed by Law." This restricted the ability of the English Crown to have a standing army or to interfere with Protestants' right to bear arms "when Papists were both Armed and Imployed contrary to Law" and established that Parliament, not the Crown, could regulate the right to bear arms. Sir William Blackstone wrote in the 18th century that the right to have arms was auxiliary to the "natural right of resistance and self-preservation" subject to suitability and allowance by law. The term arms, as used in the 1600s, refers to the process of equipping for war; it is commonly used as a synonym for "weapon". Today Great Britain's gun laws are some of the most restrictive in the world.

Inclusion of this right in a written constitution is uncommon. In 1875, 17 percent of national constitutions included a right to bear arms. Since the early twentieth century, "the proportion has been less than 9 percent and falling". In an article titled "U.S. Gun Rights Truly Are American Exceptionalism", a historical survey and comparative analysis of constitutions dating back to 1789, Tom Ginsburg and colleagues "identified only 15 constitutions (in nine countries) that had ever included an explicit right to bear arms. Almost all of these constitutions have been in Latin America, and most were from the 19th century".

== Countries recognizing the right to keep and bear arms ==
=== North America ===
==== Guatemala ====
The right to own weapons for personal use, not prohibited by the law, in the place of inhabitation, is recognized. There will not be an obligation to hand them over, except in cases ordered by a competent judge.

— Article 38 of Guatemala Constitution

The Guatemalan constitution specifies that the right to bear arms extends to "weapons not prohibited by law".

==== Honduras ====
Every person, in the exercise of their civil rights, may request a maximum of five (5) license for the possession and carrying of up to five (5) firearms by submitting an application with the following information

(...)
(1) Form with personal information and residence; (2) Brand, model, serial number, identification of modification of calibre, if any; as well as any other characteristics of the weapon; (3) Proof of having undertaken a ballistic test; (4) Payment of municipal matriculation and criminal background check; and, (5) Identification documents.

— Article 27 of Decree No. 69-2007, Modifying the Act on the Control of Firearms, Ammunition, Explosives and Other Related Materials (Honduras)

The constitution of Honduras does not protect the right to keep and bear arms.

Although not explicitly mentioned in the legislation, every person is entitled to receive a license to keep and carry arms by Honduran Statute law, provided that they fulfill the conditions required.

==== Mexico ====
The inhabitants of the United Mexican States have the right to possess arms within their domicile, for their safety and legitimate defense, except those forbidden by Federal Law and those reserved for the exclusive use of the Army, Militia, Air Force and National Guard. Federal law shall provide in what cases, conditions, under what requirements and in which places inhabitants shall be authorized to bear arms.

— Article 10 of Mexican Constitution

The Mexican constitution of 1857 first included the right to be armed. In its first version, the right was defined in similar terms to those in the Second Amendment to the United States Constitution. The Mexican Constitution of 1917 revised the right, stating that its utilization must align with local police regulations.

Another change was included in the 1917 Constitution. Since then, Mexicans have the right to be armed only within their homes, and further utilization of this right is subject to statutory authorization in Federal law.

==== United States ====
A well regulated militia, being necessary to the security of a free state, the right of the people to keep and bear arms, shall not be infringed.

— Second Amendment to the United States Constitution

In the United States, which has an English common-law tradition, a longstanding common-law right to keep and bear arms was practiced before the creation of a written national constitution. Today, this right is specifically protected by the United States Constitution and many state constitutions.

=== Europe ===
==== Czech Republic ====
The right to acquire, keep, and bear firearms is guaranteed under conditions set by this law.

— Article 1 Subsection 1 of Czech Firearms Act

(1) Everyone has the right to life. Human life is worthy of protection even before birth.
(2) Nobody may be deprived of their life.
(3) The death penalty is prohibited.
(4) Deprivation of life is not inflicted in contravention of this Article if it occurs in connection with conduct which is not criminal under the law. The right to defend own life or life of another person also with arms is guaranteed under conditions set out in the law.

— Constitutional amendment of Czech Charter of Fundamental Rights and Freedoms passed in 2021. Most of the Article is preexisting; the last sentence in subsection 4 was newly added.

Historically, the Czech lands were at the forefront of spreading civilian firearms ownership. In the 1420s and 1430s, firearms became indispensable tools for the predominantly peasant Hussite armies whose amateur combatants, including women, fended off a series of invasions of professional crusader armies of well-armored warriors with cold weapons. Throughout and after the Hussite wars, firearms' design underwent fast development, and their possession by civilians became a matter of course.

Their first firearms regulation was enacted in 1517 as a part of a general accord between the nobles and burghers and later in 1524 as a standalone Enactment on Firearms (zřízení o ručnicích). The 1517 law explicitly stated that "all people of all standing have the right to keep firearms at home" while at the same time enacting a universal carry ban. The 1524 enactment set out a process of issuing of permits for carrying of firearms and detailed enforcement and punishment for carrying without such a permit. Carrying became permitless until 1852, when Imperial Regulation No. 223 reintroduced carry permits. This law remained in force until the 1939 German invasion.

Since its inception during the Hussite Wars, the right to keep firearms endured over five hundred years until the Nazi gun ban during the German occupation in the 20th century. Firearms possession later became severely restricted during the communist period. After the Velvet Revolution, the Czech Republic instituted a shall-issue permitting process, under which all residents can keep and bear arms subject to the fulfillment of regulatory conditions.

In the Czech Republic, every resident who meets conditions laid down in Act No. 90/2024 Coll. has the right to have a firearms license issued and can then obtain a firearm. Holders of expanded authorization, which is also shall-issue, can carry firearms for protection. The right to be armed is statutorily protected.

A proposal to have the right to keep and bear arms included in the constitution was entered in the Czech Parliament in December 2016. The proposal was approved by a vote of 139 to 9 on 28 June 2017 by the Chamber of Deputies. It later failed to reach the necessary support in the Senate, where only 28 out of 59 Senators present supported it (with a constitutional majority being 36 votes).

A new proposal was entered by 35 Senators in September 2019 and then approved on 21 July 2021, adding a new sentence, according to which "the right to defend one's own life or the life of another person even with the use of a weapon is guaranteed under the conditions set by the law." The provision is interpreted as guaranteeing legal accessibility of arms in a way that must ensure the possibility of effective self-defense and as a constitutional stipulation which underscores the individual right to be prepared with arms against an eventual attack, i.e., that courts cannot draw a negative inference from the fact that a defender had been preparing to avert a possible attack with the use of weapons.

==== Switzerland ====
The right to acquire, keep and bear arms is guaranteed within boundaries of this law.

— Article 3 of Swiss Firearms Act

The Swiss have a statutory right to bear arms under Article 3 of the 1997 Weapons Act. (Note: "Art. 3 Recht auf Waffenerwerb, Waffenbesitz und Waffentragen: Das Recht auf Waffenerwerb, Waffenbesitz und Waffentragen ist im Rahmen dieses Gesetzes gewährleistet." [Right to acquire, possess and carry weapons: The right to acquire, possess and carry weapons is guaranteed in the framework of this law.]) Switzerland practices universal conscription, meaning each Swiss male between the ages of 19 and 24 is conscripted. During the draft, they can choose to serve in the army or the alternative service, and, if they choose military service, following a brief period of active duty they will be enrolled in the reserve until 7 or 10 years after their promotion to the rank of private, or an inability to serve, ends their obligation. Until December 2009, these men were required to keep their government-issued selective fire combat rifles and/or semi-automatic handguns in their homes as long as they were enrolled in the armed forces. Since January 2010, they have had the option of depositing their issued firearm at a government arsenal. Until September 2007, soldiers received 50 rounds of government-issued ammunition in a sealed box for storage at home; after 2007 only about 2,000 specialist troops are allowed to keep the military-issued ammunition at home.

In a referendum in February 2011, voters rejected a citizens' initiative that would have obliged members of the armed services to store their rifles and pistols on military compounds and required that privately owned firearms be registered.

==== United Kingdom ====
That the Subjects which are Protestants may have Arms for their Defence suitable to their Conditions and as allowed by Law.

— Bill of Rights 1689

In the United Kingdom, there is no automatic right to bear arms, although citizens may possess certain firearms on obtaining an appropriate licence. Ordinary members of the public may own sporting rifles and shotguns, subject to licensing, while handguns, automatic weapons, and semi-automatic weapons other than rimfire rifles in .22 calibre are illegal to possess without special additional conditions. All licensed firearms must be stored securely (locked) and separate from their ammunition when not attended. Regulations for airguns are less stringent and air pistols with a muzzle energy not exceeding 6 ft⋅lbf (8.1 J) and other airguns with a muzzle energy not exceeding 12 ft⋅lbf (16 J) do not require any certificates or licensing, although the same storage requirement applies.

The first serious control on firearms was established with the passing of the Firearms Act 1920, handgun restrictions being added in response to the 1996 Dunblane Massacre in which 18 people died.

Historically the English Bill of Rights 1689 allowed:

That the Subjects which are Protestants may have Arms for their Defence suitable to their Conditions and as allowed by Law.

Since 1953, it has been a criminal offence in the United Kingdom to carry a knife (except for non-locking folding knives with a cutting edge of 3 inches (7.6 centimetres) or less) or any "offensive weapon" in a public place without lawful authority (e.g. police or security forces) or reasonable excuse (e.g., tools that are needed for work, or bows and arrows used for sporting purposes). The cutting edge of a knife is separate from the blade length. The only manner in which an individual may carry arms is on private property or any property to which the public does not have a lawful right of access (e.g., a person's own home, private land, the area in a shop where the public have no access, etc.), as the law only creates the offence when it occurs in public. Furthermore, Criminal Justice Act 1988 Section 141 specifically lists all offensive weapons that cannot technically be owned, even on private property, by way of making it illegal to sell, trade, hire, etc. an offensive weapon to another person.

Furthermore, the law does not allow an offensive weapon or an ordinary item intended to be used or adapted for use as an offensive weapon to be carried in public before the threat of violence arises. This would only be acceptable in the eyes of the law if the person armed themselves immediately preceding or during an attack (in a public place). This is known as a "weapon of opportunity" or "instantaneous arming".

=== Other ===
==== Sharia law ====
Under Sharia law, there is an intrinsic freedom to own arms. However, in times of civil strife or internal violence, this right can be temporarily suspended to keep peace and prevent harm, as mentioned by Imam ash-Shatibi in his works on Maqasid ash-Shari'ah (The Intents and Purposes of Shari'ah). Citizens not practicing Islam are prohibited from bearing arms and are required to be protected by the military, the state for which they pay the jizyah. They do not need to pay the zakat in exchange.

==== Yemen ====
The citizens of the Republic shall have the right to hold the necessary rifles, machine guns, revolvers, and hunting rifles for their personal use with an amount of ammunition for the purpose of legitimate defense.

— Law Regulating Carrying Firearms, Ammunition & their Trade

Yemen recognizes a statutory right to keep and bear arms. Firearms are both easily and legally accessible.

== Gun violence and the politics of the right to bear arms ==
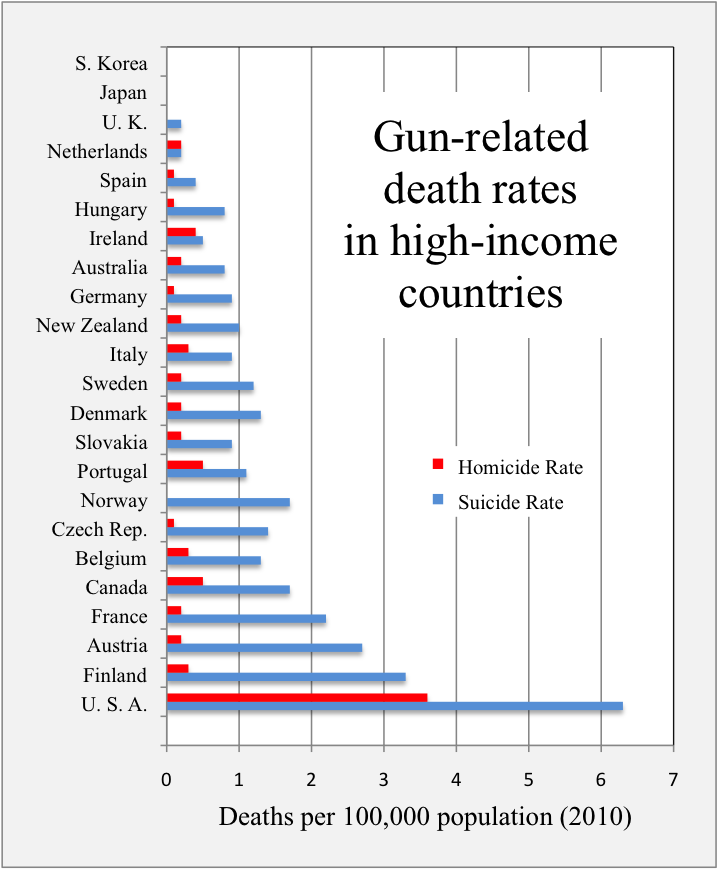
Gun-related homicide and suicide rates in high-income OECD countries, 2010, countries in graph ordered by total death rates (homicide plus suicide plus other gun-related deaths)

Multiple studies show that where people have easy access to firearms, gun-related deaths tend to be more frequent, including by suicide, homicide, and unintentional injuries.

Legal restrictions on the right to keep and bear arms are usually put in place by legislators in an attempt to reduce firearm-based violence and crime. Their actions may be the result of political groups advocating for such regulations. The Brady Campaign, Snowdrop Campaign, and the Million Mom March are examples of campaigns calling for tighter restrictions on the right to keep and bear arms. Accident statistics can be hard to obtain, but much data is available on the issue of gun ownership and gun-related deaths.

=== United Nations Interregional Crime and Justice Research Institute ===
The United Nations Interregional Crime and Justice Research Institute (UNICRI) has made comparisons between countries with different levels of gun ownership and investigated the correlation between gun ownership levels and gun homicides, and between gun ownership levels and gun suicides. A "substantial correlation" is seen in both:

During the 1989 and 1992 International Crime Surveys, data on gun ownership in eighteen countries have been collected on which WHO data on suicide and homicide committed with guns and other means are also available. The results presented in a previous paper based on the fourteen countries surveyed during the first ICS and on rank correlations (Spearman's rho), suggested that gun ownership may increase suicides and homicides using firearms, while it may not reduce suicides and homicides with other means. In the present analysis, four additional countries covered by the 1992 ICS only have been included, and Pearson's correlation coefficients have been used. The results confirm those presented in the previous study.

— Martin Killias, Understanding Crime, Experiences of Crime and Crime Control – Acts of the International Conference

UNICRI also investigated the relationship between gun ownership levels and other forms of homicide or suicide to determine whether high levels of gun ownership added to or merely displaced other forms of homicide or suicide. They reported that "widespread gun ownership has not been found to reduce the likelihood of fatal events committed with other means. Thus, people do not turn to knives and other potentially lethal instruments less often when more guns are available, but more guns usually means more victims of suicide and homicide." The researchers concluded that "all we know is that guns do not reduce fatal events due to other means, but that they go along with more shootings. Although we do not know why exactly this is so, we have a good reason to suspect guns to play a fatal role in this".

This research found that guns were the major cause of homicides in three of the fourteen countries it studied: Northern Ireland, Italy, and the United States. Although some data indicates that reducing the availability of one significant type of arms—firearms—leads to reductions both in gun crimes and gun suicides and moderate decreases in overall crimes and overall suicides, the author did caution that "reducing the number of guns in the hands of the private citizen may become a hopeless task beyond a certain point," citing the American example where gun laws remain a subject of heated debate (see also Gun politics in the United States).

A posterior study by UNICRI researchers from 2001 examined the link between household gun ownership and overall homicide, overall suicide, as well as gun homicide and gun suicide rates amongst 21 countries. The researchers declared, "The results show very strong correlations between the presence of guns in the home and suicide committed with a gun, rates of gun-related homicide involving female victims, and gun-related assault." There were no significant correlations detected for total homicide and suicide rates, as well as gun homicide rates involving male victims.

=== Other ===
Some other research indicates that gun levels do not affect the total number of homicides or the total number of suicides, but rather affect the share of homicides or suicides committed with guns.

Public-health critic, gun-rights proponent, and editor-in-chief of Surgical Neurology International Miguel Faria contended in 2012 that keeping and bearing arms not only has constitutional protection, but also that firearms have beneficial aspects that have been ignored by the public health establishment in which he played a part. He also contended that guns benefit self-defense, collective defense, and protecting life and property.

A 2012 study in the journal Annual Review of Public Health found that suicide rates are greater in households with firearms than those without them.

== See also ==
- Index of gun politics articles
- List of countries by gun ownership
- Overview of gun laws by nation
- Right of self-defense
- Knife legislation
