= Mikhail Kogan (physician) =

American physician

- Born: Moscow, Soviet Union
- Education: Temple University (BS); Drexel University College of Medicine (MD)
- Occupations: Physician, academic
- Employer: George Washington University
- Title: Medical Director, GW Center for Integrative Medicine; Associate Professor of Medicine

Mikhail Kogan is an American physician specializing in geriatric medicine, integrative medicine, and palliative care. He is Medical Director of the George Washington University Center for Integrative Medicine and Associate Professor of Medicine at the George Washington University School of Medicine & Health Sciences.

== Early life and education ==
Kogan was born in Moscow, then part of the Soviet Union. During his teenage years, he emigrated with his family to Israel before later settling in the United States. He studied biology at the Technion – Israel Institute of Technology before earning a Bachelor of Science degree in biochemistry from Temple University. He received his Doctor of Medicine from the Drexel University College of Medicine in 2004. Following medical school, Kogan completed a residency in internal medicine through the Social and Primary Care Program at Montefiore Medical Center in New York City. He subsequently completed a fellowship in geriatric medicine at George Washington University Medical Center.

== Career ==
Following completion of his fellowship, Kogan joined the faculty of the George Washington University School of Medicine and Health Sciences, where he became Associate Professor of Medicine. Kogan was named a Washingtonian Top Doctor in 2023 and was again listed as a Top Doctor in 2025, in the geriatrics category. He serves as Medical Director of the George Washington University Center for Integrative Medicine and practices geriatric medicine at George Washington University Hospital.

At George Washington University, Kogan has held academic leadership positions including Associate Director of the Geriatrics Fellowship Program and Associate Director of the Interdisciplinary Integrative Medicine Fellowship.

In 2012, Kogan founded the AIM Health Institute, a non-profit organization that provides integrative medical services for underserved and terminally ill patients in the Washington metropolitan area.

== Research ==
Kogan's research has focused on geriatric medicine, integrative medicine, lifestyle medicine, nutrition, palliative care, and the management of chronic diseases in older adults. His publications have examined subjects including chronic pain, dementia, cancer care, healthy aging, complementary medicine, and nutrition.

A significant area of his research concerns the therapeutic use of medical cannabis in geriatric and palliative medicine. He has published studies and reviews on the use of cannabinoids for chronic pain, cancer-related symptoms, insomnia, anxiety, behavioural symptoms associated with dementia, and the integration of medical cannabis into clinical practice. His research has also examined approaches to healthy aging, nutrition, and lifestyle interventions for older adults, including reducing unnecessary medication use and incorporating complementary therapies into geriatric care.

Kogan has also contributed to the development of educational resources on medical cannabis for physicians and other healthcare professionals. He co-authored publications examining competencies and curriculum development for medical cannabis education in healthcare training programmes.

In addition to cannabis-related research, Kogan has published on nutrition, lifestyle interventions, complementary medicine, oncology, primary care, and chronic disease management in older adults.

Kogan has also commented publicly on methods of medical cannabis administration, including non-inhaled delivery systems such as suppositories, in discussions of their potential clinical applications and safety considerations.

== Publications ==
Kogan is the author of Medical Marijuana: Dr. Kogan's Evidence-Based Guide to the Health Benefits of Cannabis and CBD, published in 2021 by Avery, an imprint of Penguin Random House.

He is the chief editor of Integrative Geriatric Medicine, published by Oxford University Press as part of the Andrew Weil Integrative Medicine Library. His publications include books on medical cannabis and integrative geriatric medicine, as well as peer-reviewed research on medical cannabis education, nutrition, aging, complementary medicine, and chronic disease management.

== Professional service ==
Kogan has served on boards, advisory groups, and editorial committees involved in integrative medicine, oncology, and healthy aging. These have included the National Cancer Institute's Physician Data Query (PDQ) Complementary and Alternative Medicine Editorial Board, the American Board of Integrative Medicine, the George Washington University Center for Aging, Health, and Humanities, IM4US, and the AIM Health Institute.

In 2026, Kogan was appointed to the Medical Advisory Board of the National Compassionate Care Council (NCCC), an organization advocating for evidence-based cannabis policy reform.

He founded the AIM Health Institute, a non-profit organization established to expand access to integrative medicine for underserved and terminally ill patients in the Washington metropolitan area.

== Selected works ==
- Medical Marijuana: Dr. Kogan's Evidence-Based Guide to the Health Benefits of Cannabis and CBD (2021)
- Integrative Geriatric Medicine (chief editor, Oxford University Press, 2017)
- Kogan M, Quan T, Evanoff AB, et al. "Medical Cannabis Education for Health Care Professionals". JAMA Network Open. 2024.
- Kligler B, Maizes V, Schachter S, Park CM, Gaudet T, Benn R, Lee R, Remen RN, Kogan M, et al. "Developing and Implementing Core Competencies for Integrative Medicine Fellowships". Academic Medicine. 2014.
