= Darrell Rigel =

American dermatologist

Darrell S. Rigel
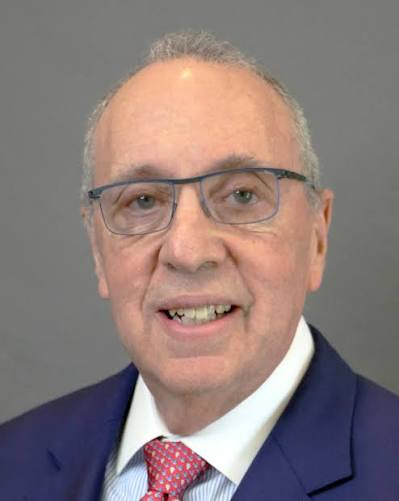
- Rigel
- Citizenship: American
- Education: Massachusetts Institute of Technology (SB; MS (MBA)); George Washington University (MD)
- Known for: Co-development of the ABCD and ABCDE criteria for melanoma detection; lead editor of Cancer of the Skin
- Awards: American Academy of Dermatology Gold Medal (2016); MIT George B. Morgan Award (2014); Melanoma Research Foundation Humanitarian Award
- Scientific career
- Fields: Dermatology; dermatologic surgery; melanoma and skin cancer; photoprotection; photoaging
- Workplaces: NYU Grossman School of Medicine; Icahn School of Medicine at Mount Sinai; UT Southwestern Medical Center; Cooper Clinic
- Website: www.drrigel.com

Darrell Spencer Rigel is an American dermatologist whose clinical and research work has focused on melanoma detection, skin-cancer prevention, ultraviolet radiation, photoprotection, and dermatologic surgery. He is a clinical professor at the NYU Grossman School of Medicine, an adjunct clinical professor at the Icahn School of Medicine at Mount Sinai and UT Southwestern Medical Center, and a dermatologist at Cooper Clinic in Dallas.

Rigel co-developed the ABCD criteria for recognizing possible melanoma in the 1980s. The mnemonic became widely used in medical education and the lay press, and he later co-authored work supporting its expansion to the ABCDE criteria. He has served as president of the American Academy of Dermatology, the American Dermatological Association, and the American Society for Dermatologic Surgery. In 2016, he received the American Academy of Dermatology Gold Medal, the highest honor conferred by the academy.

== Education and training ==
Rigel earned a Bachelor of Science in management information sciences and an MS (MBA) from the Massachusetts Institute of Technology. He received his MD from George Washington University School of Medicine & Health Sciences in 1978. He completed an internship in internal medicine at New York Hospital-Cornell University Medical Center, followed by dermatology residency and dermatologic surgery fellowship training at New York University. At NYU, he also served as chief resident and as a National Institutes of Health training fellow. During medical school, Rigel conducted research at the National Cancer Institute.

== Academic and clinical career ==
Rigel is a clinical professor in the Ronald O. Perelman Department of Dermatology at NYU Grossman School of Medicine. He also holds adjunct clinical appointments at Mount Sinai and UT Southwestern and practices at Cooper Clinic. His clinical interests include melanoma, other skin cancers, precancerous lesions, sun-damaged skin, and high-risk pigmented lesions. He serves as consultant dermatologist for the New York Yankees.

Rigel co-founded the Fall and Winter Clinical Dermatology Conferences with Mark Lebwohl and James Q. Del Rosso and serves as a scientific co-chair of both meetings. He was one of the original editors of SKIN: The Journal of Cutaneous Medicine when the journal launched in 2017 and currently serves as one of its editors-in-chief. Rigel is also the lead editor of the textbook Cancer of the Skin.

Rigel has delivered more than 1,000 presentations at medical and governmental policy conferences and has chaired national and international conferences and symposia.

== Research contributions ==
=== ABCD and ABCDE criteria ===
In 1985, Robert J. Friedman, Rigel, and Alfred W. Kopf published "Early Detection of Malignant Melanoma: The Role of Physician Examination and Self-Examination of the Skin" in CA: A Cancer Journal for Clinicians. The article described the ABCD mnemonic: asymmetry, border irregularity, color variation, and diameter greater than 6 mm. The criteria were intended as a simple way for physicians and the public to recognize melanoma warning signs and were subsequently used in education campaigns.

In 2004, Rigel and colleagues reviewed the criteria in JAMA and recommended adding E for "evolving" to emphasize changes in a lesion over time. Rigel, Friedman, Kopf, and David Polsky further discussed the ABCDE criteria in a 2005 article in Archives of Dermatology. The American Academy of Dermatology uses the ABCDE framework in its patient-education materials on melanoma warning signs.

=== Skin-cancer prevention and photoprotection ===
Rigel's research has included melanoma risk and prognosis, the effects of ultraviolet radiation on the skin, sunscreen performance, skin self-examination, and dermatologic surgery. During planning for the American Academy of Dermatology's 1985 skin-cancer initiatives, he advocated national skin-cancer screenings; by 2010, the academy's annual screening program had examined more than two million people. In 1987, he testified before the U.S. House Subcommittee on Health and the Environment about ozone depletion and skin-cancer risk. He has also testified before Congress and the U.S. Food and Drug Administration on dermatology-related issues and has participated in public discussion of sunscreen regulation and skin-cancer screening.

== Professional leadership ==
Rigel served as president of the American Academy of Dermatology and the American Academy of Dermatology Association, the American Dermatological Association, and the American Society for Dermatologic Surgery. Rigel served for nine years as a director of the American Board of Dermatology and as a regional chair of MIT's Educational Counselor program.

== Awards and honors ==
- American Academy of Dermatology Gold Medal (2016)
- George B. Morgan Award, MIT Alumni Association (2014)
- Humanitarian Award, Melanoma Research Foundation
- Clarence S. Livingood Memorial Award and Lectureship, American Academy of Dermatology (2012)
- Honorary membership, American Academy of Dermatology (2009)
- American Cancer Society National Honor Citation for Skin Cancer Programs
- Multiple Presidential Citations from the American Academy of Dermatology and the American Society for Dermatologic Surgery for public-education programs in skin cancer

== Selected publications ==
=== Books ===
- Rigel, Darrell S.; Robinson, June K.; Ross, Merrick I.; Friedman, Robert J.; Cockerell, Clay J.; Lim, Henry W.; Stockfleth, Eggert; Kirkwood, John M., eds. (2011). Cancer of the Skin (2nd ed.). Elsevier/Saunders. ISBN 978-1-4377-1788-4.

=== Articles ===
- Rigel, Darrell S.; Robins, Perry; Friedman, Robert J. (1981). "Predicting Recurrence of Basal-Cell Carcinomas Treated by Microscopically Controlled Excision: A Recurrence Index Score". Journal of Dermatologic Surgery and Oncology. 7 (10): 807–810. doi:10.1111/j.1524-4725.1981.tb00171.x. PMID 7298981.
- Kopf, Alfred W.; Rigel, Darrell S.; Friedman, Robert J. (1982). "The Rising Incidence and Mortality Rate of Malignant Melanoma". Journal of Dermatologic Surgery and Oncology. 8 (9): 760–761. doi:10.1111/j.1524-4725.1982.tb02676.x. PMID 7130506.
- Friedman, Robert J.; Rigel, Darrell S.; Kopf, Alfred W. (1985). "Early Detection of Malignant Melanoma: The Role of Physician Examination and Self-Examination of the Skin". CA: A Cancer Journal for Clinicians. 35 (3): 130–151. doi:10.3322/canjclin.35.3.130.
- Abbasi, Naheed R.; Shaw, Helen M.; Rigel, Darrell S.; Friedman, Robert J.; McCarthy, William H.; Osman, Iman; Kopf, Alfred W.; Polsky, David (2004). "Early Diagnosis of Cutaneous Melanoma: Revisiting the ABCD Criteria". JAMA. 292 (22): 2771–2776. doi:10.1001/jama.292.22.2771. PMID 15585738.
- Rigel, Darrell S.; Friedman, Robert J.; Kopf, Alfred W.; Polsky, David (2005). "ABCDE--An Evolving Concept in the Early Detection of Melanoma". Archives of Dermatology. 141 (8): 1032–1034. doi:10.1001/archderm.141.8.1032. PMID 16103334.
- Rigel, Darrell S.; Russak, Julie; Friedman, Robert J. (2010). "The Evolution of Melanoma Diagnosis: 25 Years Beyond the ABCDs". CA: A Cancer Journal for Clinicians. 60 (5): 301–316. doi:10.3322/caac.20074. PMID 20671054.
