= Miguel A. Faria Jr. =

American physician and editor

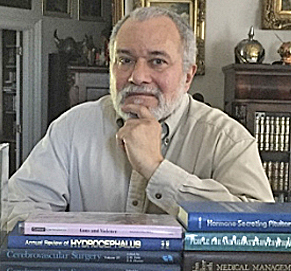
- Faria in 2020
- Born: 30 September 1952 (age 74); Sancti Spiritus, Cuba
- Education: University of South Carolina; Medical University of South Carolina; University of Florida; Emory University
- Medical career
- Profession: Neurosurgeon, medical editor, professor, author, writer, medical historian

Miguel A. Faria Jr. (born 30 September 1952) is Associate Editor in Chief in neuropsychiatry; history of medicine; and socioeconomics, politics, and world affairs of Surgical Neurology International (SNI) from 2012–present, before that a member of the editorial board of Surgical Neurology from 2004 to 2010. He is a retired neurosurgeon and neuroscientist, medical editor and author, medical historian and medical ethicist, public health critic, and advocate for the Second Amendment to the U.S. Constitution.

== Early life and education ==
Faria was born in Sancti Spiritus, Cuba. Faria's parents were members of the urban underground Revolutionary Directorate (Directorio Revolucionario Estudiantil; DRE) under Faure Chomón and Rolando Cubela that fought against Fulgencio Batista. Faria (age 13) and his father, also a physician, were prompted to escape from Cuba while under the watch of Cuba's State Security. Their escape through several Caribbean islands is narrated in Faria's book.

Faria entered and completed his undergraduate studies at the University of South Carolina, receiving a BS degree (Biology and Psychology) and graduating magna cum laude in 1973. He then attended the Medical University of South Carolina in Charleston, South Carolina, and was inducted into Alpha Omega Alpha Medical Honor Society (1975) in his second year. Faria graduated with honors, receiving the Merck's Manual Award for scholastic achievement, and earning his M.D. degree in 1977. He was a friend and classmate of the prominent oncology surgeon, S. Eva Singletary. Faria completed his surgical internship at Shands Teaching Hospital at the University of Florida (1977–1978), and his neurosurgical residency at Emory University (1978–1983).

== Professional life ==
Faria practiced neurosurgery in Macon, Georgia, at HCA Coliseum Medical Centers, where he served as Chief of staff. Faria was also clinical professor of neurosurgery (ret.) and adjunct professor of medical history (ret.) at Mercer University School of Medicine. Faria has written over 200 medical, scientific, and professional articles as well as letters or editorials published in the medical literature. More than 70 of these articles are currently indexed in PubMed. His specialties range from brain surgery for the removal of cerebral tumors; traumatic blood clots of the brain; diagnosis and treatment of pituitary tumors via microsurgery; diagnosis and treatment of cerebral aneurysms and arteriovenous malformations; radiographic techniques; diagnosis, evaluation, and treatment of the Chiari type I and II malformations; advances in neurosurgery; to medical history and politics.

Faria served on the Injury Research Grant Review Committee (later renamed the Initial Review Group [IRG]) of the Centers for Disease Control and Prevention (CDC) from 2002–2005, reviewing grants seeking public funding for scientific and technical merit in the area of injury prevention and control.

During the 1990s, Faria was involved in a gun control debate regarding the CDC's National Center for Injury Prevention and Control (NCIPC). Faria felt that the NCIPC's program on gun violence was biased against gun owners, promoting "politicized, result-oriented research." In March 1996, Faria testified before the U.S. House Appropriations Subcommittee for Labor, Health, and Human Services to that effect stating, "I have yet to see a published report that has been funded by the NCIPC in which the benefits of firearms in the hands of law-abiding citizens have been published even though they are there ... if you don't conclude that guns are bad and that they need to be eradicated because they are a 'public health menace,' they are not published." Congress eventually prohibited the CDC from funding gun research and proscribed public health officials from using taxpayer's money in lobbying and participating in politically partisan activities.

== Humanitarian effort ==
In March 1990, Faria traveled to El Salvador as part of a mission sponsored by the politically conservative Accuracy in Media (AIM). During this trip to El Salvador, Faria visited hospitals and orphanages. After his return to the United States, Faria, who was then serving as chief-of-staff at HCA Coliseum Medical Centers in Macon, Georgia, convinced Dr. Thomas F. Frist, Jr., chief executive officer of Hospital Corporation of America, to send humanitarian assistance to El Salvador. As a result of Faria's effort, Salvadoran hospitals received a shipment of medications, beds, wheelchairs and physical therapy equipment.

== Publications and editorships ==
During 1993–1995, Faria was the editor of the Journal of the Medical Association of Georgia, taking that state medical journal to national prominence and controversy, which resulted in pressure on him to resign. Faria has also described the circumstances surrounding his resignation in correspondence and in his book Medical Warrior. In 1996 Faria founded and served as editor-in-chief of the Medical Sentinel of the Association of American Physicians and Surgeons (AAPS). As editor of the Medical Sentinel, Faria called for an "open data, public review policy in peer reviewed medical journalism." He called for other medical journal editors to post research data online thereby allowing investigators to validate scientific conclusions before public policy is implemented, particularly in the area of public health. The purpose of this policy is to ensure that public policy is dictated by sound scientific principles and not by premature assertions or tainted by politics or ideology. Faria left AAPS in 2002 to pursue other interests.

From 2004 to 2010, Faria served on the editorial board of Surgical Neurology, an international journal of neurosurgery, formerly the Official International Journal of the Neurosurgical Societies of Belgium, Brazil, China, Romania, Russia, and Taiwan. Surgical Neurology International, its successor publication, was also headed by James I. Ausman, M.D., editor-in-chief. Faria was one of its editors, along with his colleague, Dr. Russell Blaylock. In 2003 Faria published a three part history of surgery article, "Violence, Mental Illness, and the Brain – A Brief History of Psychosurgery." This theme was later expanded with other controversial areas in neuroscience into a book.

In 2015, a raging debate began between Faria and Ezekiel Emanuel on the issue of bioethics and longevity, following the latter's publication of an article stating life was not worth living after age 75 and that longevity was not a worthwhile goal in health care policy. This was denied by Faria, who claimed that life could still be fruitful and rewarding after that age, if healthy lifestyles are led. Faria states that longevity is a worthwhile goal and that the compression of morbidity of James Fries should be upgraded from a hypothesis to a theory. This debate also pits traditional individual-based medical ethicists against the utilitarian perspective of the modern bioethics movement.

Faria researched Soviet communism and expounded on the political crimes committed by the Soviet totalitarian regime, particularly those that took place during the Russian Revolution and subsequently by Joseph Stalin. Faria propounded a theory of the political spectrum that depends on the degrees of individual liberty as opposed to government control, redefining the political left to include fascism as well as communism.

Faria has also published an intriguing medical history article positing that Stalin's death was due to deliberate poisoning by a cabal of his inner circle, who also delayed medical treatment. His article hinges on the work of previous investigators but is substantiated by clinical reports and autopsy findings, which were published in Pravda contemporaneously but forgotten in the Soviet archives. Faria has also elaborated on Stalin's infamous Doctors Plot, a developing antisemitic plot, which was only just barely aborted by Stalin's death.

Faria has written or coauthored several chapters in medical textbooks, and his works are cited and referenced in a number of other books and publications. He is the author of three books: Vandals at the Gates of Medicine — Historic Perspectives on the Battle Over Health Care Reform (1995), Medical Warrior: Fighting Corporate Socialized Medicine (1997), and Cuba in Revolution: Escape From a Lost Paradise (2002). Faria's last historical and autobiographical book, Cuba in Revolution – Escape From a Lost Paradise, details his childhood experiences and his family's involvement in the Cuban Revolution. On October 1, 2019, Faria's book, America, Guns, and Freedom: A Journey Into Politics and the Public Health & Gun Control Movements was released. His most recent books are Controversies in Medicine and Neuroscience: Through the Prism of History, Neurobiology, and Bioethics published by Cambridge Scholars Publishing on March 23, 2023., Cuba’s Eternal Revolution through the Prism of Insurgency, Socialism, and Espionage (June, 2023), Stalin, Mao, Communism, and the 21st Century Aftermath in Russia and China (2024), Contrasting Ideals and Ends in the American and French Revolutions (2024) and The Roman Republic, History, Myths, Politics, and Novelistic Historiography (2025)

== Appointments ==
- Editor of the Journal of the Medical Association of Georgia (1993–1995)
- Founder and editor-in-chief of the Medical Sentinel (1996-2003)
- Clinical Professor of Surgery (Neurosurgery, ret.) Mercer University School of Medicine
- Adjunct Professor of Medical History (ret.) Mercer University School of Medicine
- Neuroscience Preceptorship (ret.). Mercer University School of Medicine
- Chief of staff, HCA Coliseum Medical Centers, 1989; honorary staff to the present
- Ex-member of the Injury Research Grant Review Committee of the Centers for Disease Control and Prevention (CDC; 2002–2005)
- Member of the editorial board of Surgical Neurology, an international journal of clinical neurosurgery (2004–2010)
- Associate Editor in Chief in neuropsychiatry; history of medicine; and socioeconomics, politics, and world affairs of Surgical Neurology International ("SNI"; 2011–present.)

== Awards and memberships ==
- Magna cum laude graduate, University of South Carolina, 1973
- Alpha Omega Alpha – Medical Honor Society, 1975
- Merck's Manual Award for Scholastic Achievement, 1977
- Doctor of Medicine, Medical University of South Carolina (MUSC), 1977
- Board Certification in Neurological Surgery, 1985
- National Association of Scholars, 1992–1997
- Laser Association of Neurological Surgeons International, 1988–1993
- American Association for the History of Medicine, 1993–1997
- Georgia Neurosurgical Society, Life Member, 1994
- American Association of Neurological Surgeons, Life Member, 1994
- Who's Who in Georgia (1988-1989)
- Physician's Recognition Award, American Medical Association, 1981, 1984, 1990.
- Medical Association of Georgia, President's Award, Rx for Georgia, July 27, 1993.
- Award of Appreciation for the editorship of the Journal of the Medical Association of Georgia (1993-1995).
- Certificate of Appreciation in Recognition and Appreciation of Service on the National Center for Injury Prevention and Control Initial Review Group of the Centers for Disease Control and Prevention (2002-2005).
- Recipient of the Americanism Medal from the Nathaniel Macon Chapter of the Daughters of the American Revolution, 1998.
- Gun Rights Defender of the Month Award, September, 1999; by the Citizens Committee for the Right to Keep and Bear Arms.

== Professional publications and scholarly citations ==
- Over 200 medical, scientific, and professional articles as well as letters or editorials published in the medical literature and popular press. More than seventy of these articles are currently listed by NCBI/PubMed. and Citations of Faria's work are searchable under Google Scholar Listings and Google Book Citations
