= Barbara Lee Bass =

American surgeon

- Education: Tufts University; University of Virginia
- Children: 2
- Scientific career
- Fields: Endocrine and breast surgery
- Workplaces: George Washington University; University of Maryland, Baltimore; Houston Methodist Hospital; Cornell University

Barbara Lee Bass is an American surgeon and academic administrator specializing in endocrine and breast surgery. She has served as dean of the George Washington University School of Medicine & Health Sciences since 2020. She is the Walter A. Bloedorn Chair of Administrative Medicine.

== Life ==
Bass grew up in Northern Virginia. She earned a B.S. from Tufts University. She received a M.D. from the University of Virginia School of Medicine in 1979. In 1986, Bass completed a general surgical residency at George Washington University. During her residency, she mentored under Kathryn Anderson and Paul E. Shorb. She conducted a research fellowship at the Walter Reed Army Institute of Research while she was a captain in the United States Army Medical Corps. In 1988, Bass became a Fellow of the American College of Surgeons.

Bass worked at the Uniformed Services University of the Health Sciences and at George Washington University as a general surgeon. She was a surgeon-scientist at the Veteran Affairs Hospital in Washington, D.C. Bass worked at the University of Maryland School of Medicine in a number of roles. From 1994 to 2005, she was a professor of surgery and chief of gastrointestinal surgical research at the Veterans Affairs Medical Center, Baltimore. She was the associate chair for research and academic affairs, and the general surgery residency program director in the department of surgery from 1999 to 2005. From 2005 to 2019, Bass worked at the Houston Methodist Hospital. She was the John F. and Carolyn Bookout Distinguished Presidential Endowed Chair and chair of the department of surgery. Bass was also chaired the surgery department in the Houston Methodist Specialty Physician Group. Bass was a professor of surgery at the Weill Cornell Medical College and the Houston Methodist Institute for Academic Medicine.

Bass was the chair of the American Board of Surgery and served as the president of the Society for Surgery of the Alimentary Tract and the Society of Surgical Chairs. In 2017, she was elected to an honorary fellowship in the Royal College of Surgeons and she was the 98th president of the American College of Surgeons. She specializes in endocrine and breast surgery. On January 15, 2020, Bass joined George Washington University as its vice president of health affairs and the dean of the School of Medicine & Health Sciences. She is the first woman to serve in the role. On May 18, 2022, she was installed as the Walter. A Bloedorn Chair of Administrative Medicine.

Bass is married to lawyer Richard S. Marshall. They have two sons.
