= George Washington University School of Medicine & Health Sciences =

Medical school in Washington, D.C, US

Coordinates: 38.9007°N 77.0508°W

George Washington University School of Medicine and Health Sciences
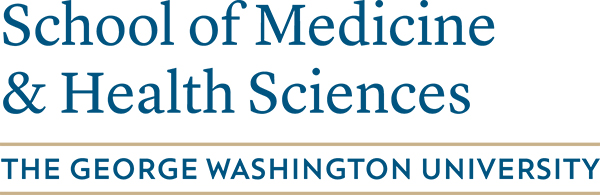
- Motto: Seek Truth and Pursue It Steadily
- Type: Private
- Established: 1824; 202 years ago
- Parent institution: George Washington University
- Endowment: $1.57 billion
- Provost: Steven Lerman
- Dean: Barbara Lee Bass
- Faculty: 677 (Full-Time)
- Students: 712
- Location: 2300 I Street NW Washington DC 20037, Washington, District of Columbia, United States
- Campus: Urban - Foggy Bottom
- Website: smhs.gwu.edu

The George Washington University School of Medicine and Health Sciences (abbreviated as GW Medical School, GW Medicine, or SMHS) is the medical school of the George Washington University, in Washington, D.C. It was the eleventh medical school to open in the United States.

== Academics ==
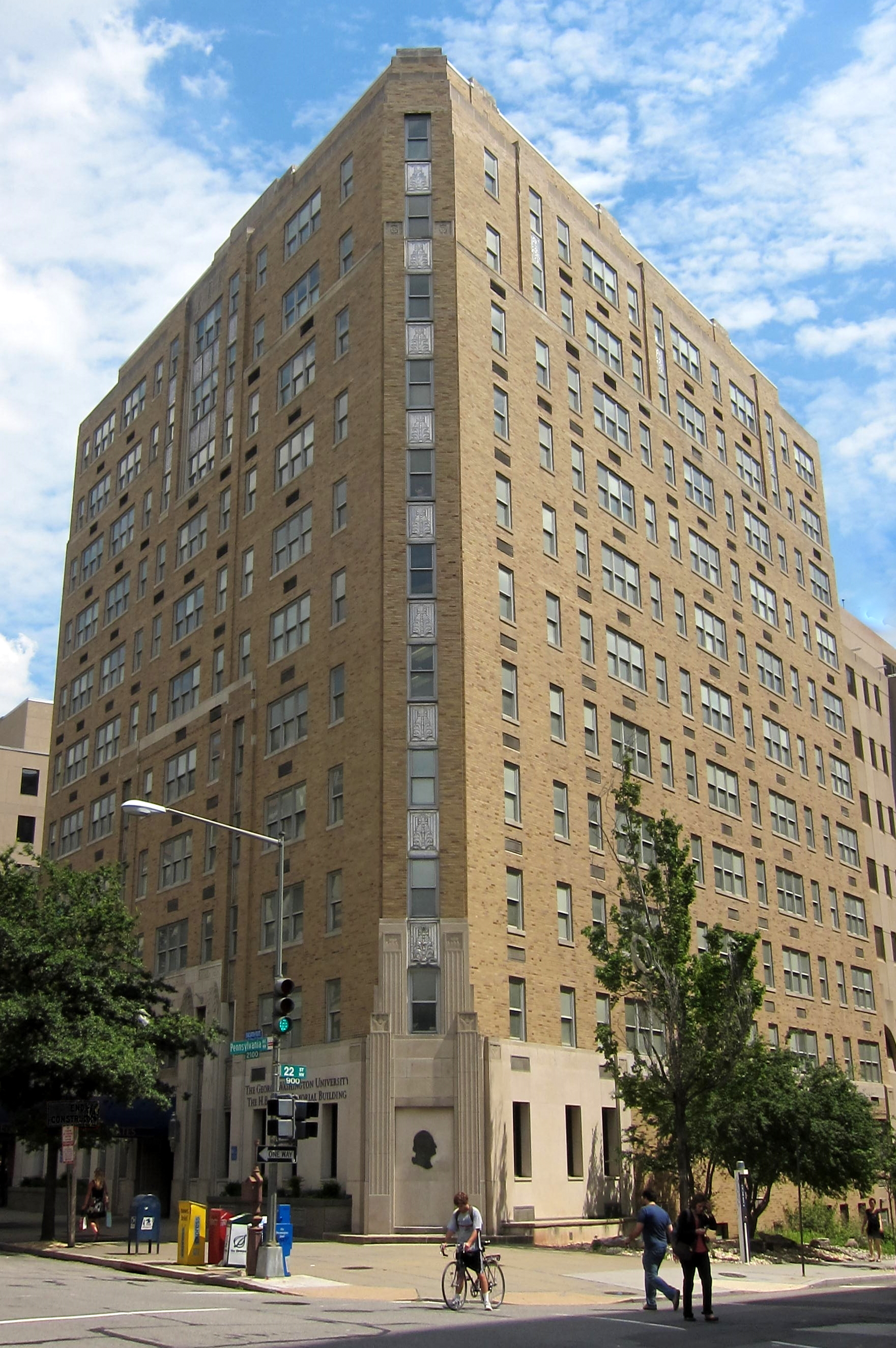
H. B. Burns Memorial Medical Building.

The School of Medicine and Health Sciences contains a variety of programs such as the M.D. Program, the Physician Assistant program, and the Physical Therapy program. Multiple Nobel laureates have been affiliated with SMHS, including Ferid Murad, Vincent du Vigneaud, and Julius Axelrod.

The Himmelfarb Health Sciences Library is the academic library for GW SMHS.

=== International Medicine Program ===
The International MD Program was developed by the Office of International Medicine Programs at GW in response to demand for U.S.-educated physicians abroad. The International MD Program is designed to facilitate international students who wish to practice medicine, and to further GW's mission to improve the health and well-being of communities beyond its locale by promoting the exchange of knowledge across cultures.

Residency training for graduates of non-U.S. medical schools and colleges is also provided by GW SMHS.

=== Other programs ===
Other programs include clinical laboratory sciences and administration training. In addition to numerous bachelor, certificate, and masters programs, the school also offers advanced training through a nurse practitioner/doctor of nursing practice program, a physician assistant program, doctor of physical therapy program, and a PhD in translational sciences program. The school offers many Early Selection options through participating universities, as well as a seven-year accelerated program.

=== Admissions ===
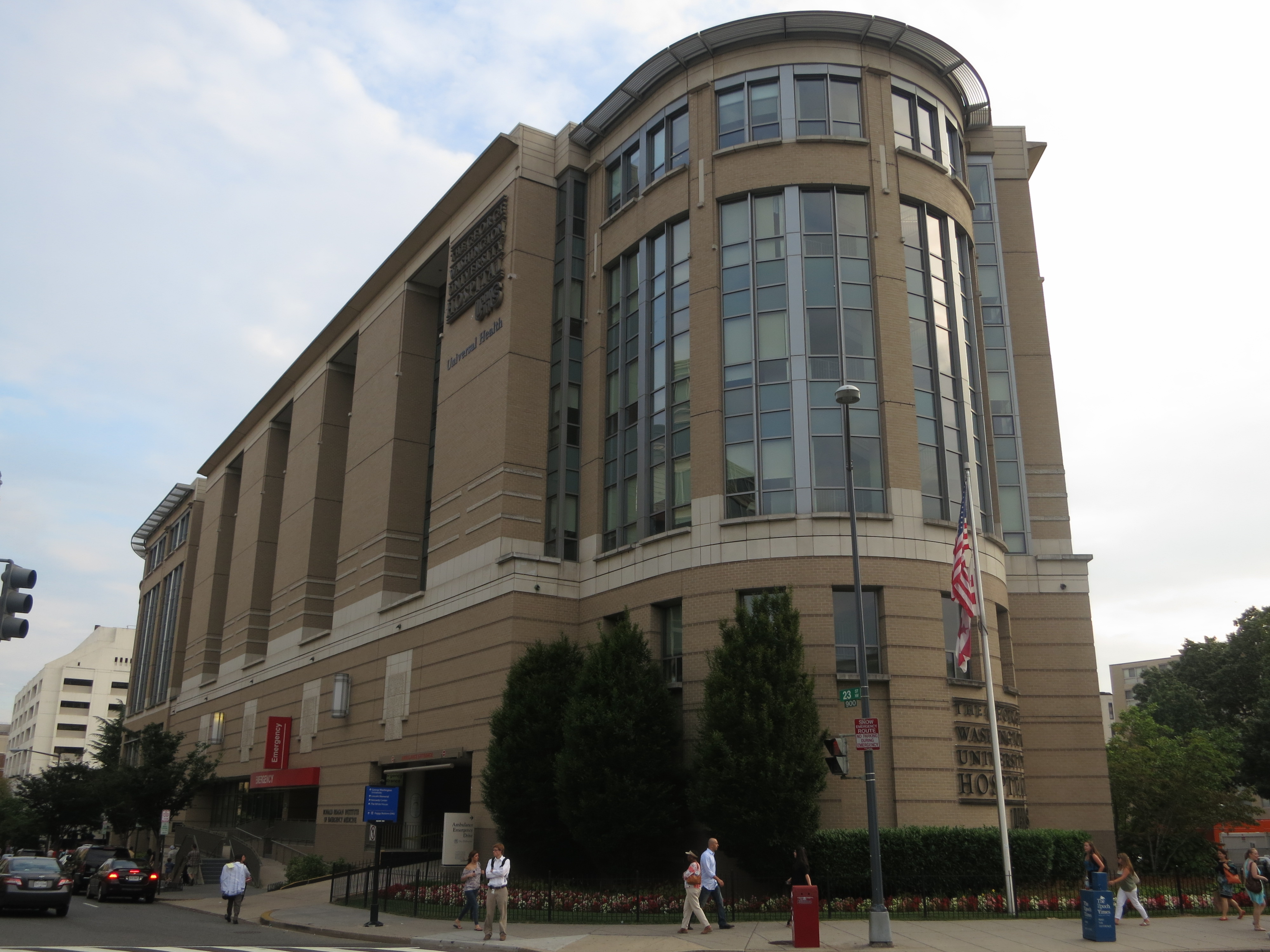
The George Washington University Hospital.

Four out of every ten MD students holds an undergraduate degrees in the arts, humanities, or social sciences. The Practice of Medicine (POM) course spans the entire length of a medical student's education. GW was one of the first in the country to place students in clinical settings from the start of their medical school experience.

The student body of each new admitted class expanded significantly from about 182 students to 210 in Fall 2024, with 30 students in the Class of 2028 admitted specifically to do their clinical rotations at the school's new regional medical campus at Sinai Hospital in Baltimore. 3rd-year GW medical students transferring from the Washington, DC area to do all of their core clinical rotations at Sinai Hospital first began in Fall 2023.

== Research ==
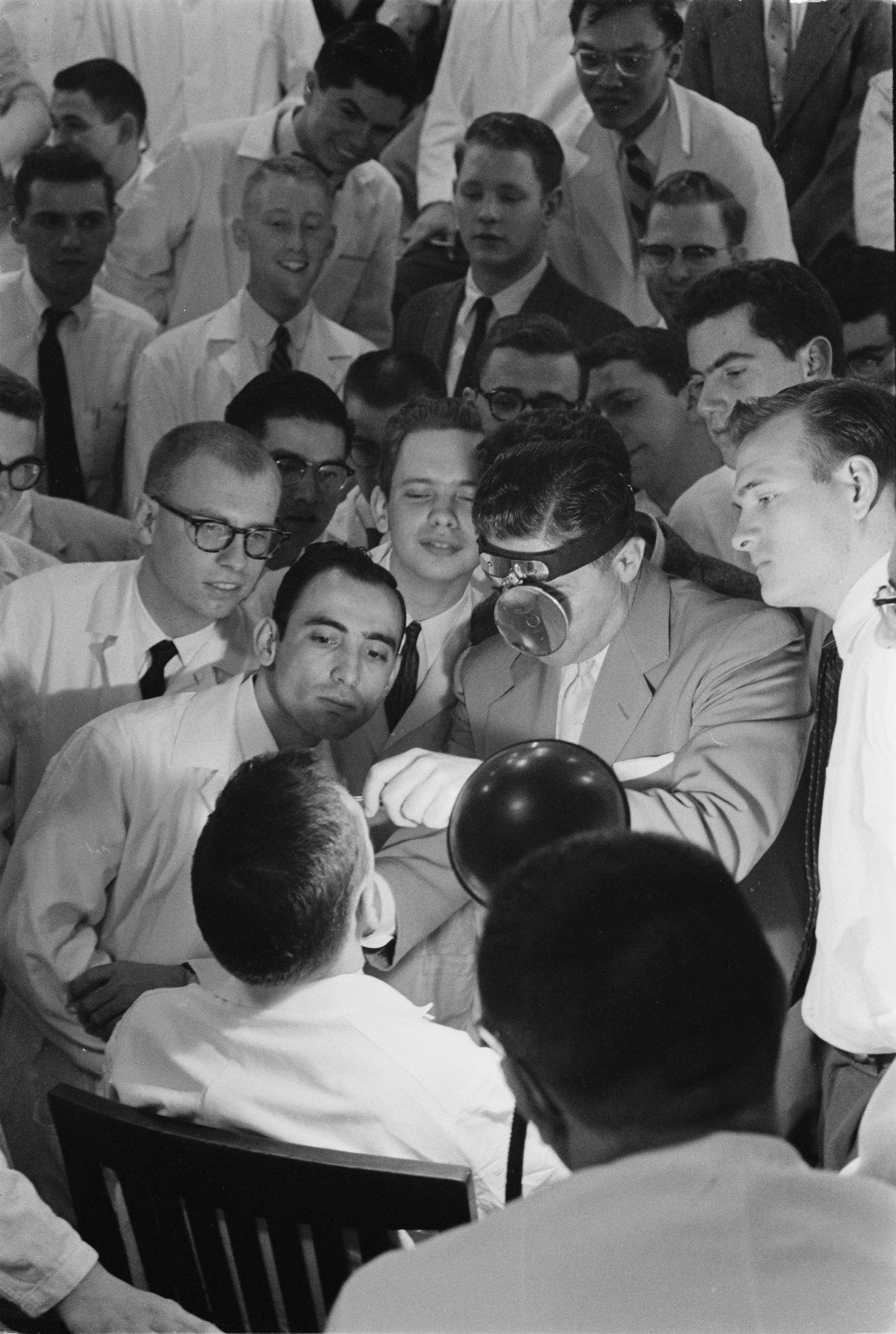
George Washington University Medical School USNWR.

GW SMHS is home to many research centers and institutes. Among them are the Dr. Cyrus and Myrtle Katzen Cancer Research Center, the GW Cancer Center, the Rodham Institute, the Institute for Biomedical Sciences, and the GW Institute for Neuroscience.

== Affiliations ==
=== Children's National Medical Center ===
The Department of Pediatrics within SMHS is housed at Children's National Medical Center. In addition, the SMHS and Children's National partner on a variety of projects and initiatives.

=== Medical Faculty Associates ===
The school has a partnership with the George Washington University Medical Faculty Associates who have over 800 physicians on staff that provide teaching and professional services to the community. The staff of GW MFA are also academic clinical faculty of the SMHS.

== Controversy ==
In 2008, the LCME or Liaison Committee on Medical Education put the George Washington University Medical School on accreditation probation, citing a number of issues. While declining to publish the entire list, among the problems acknowledged by GW were its outdated system of managing its curriculum, the curriculum itself, high levels of student debt, student mistreatment, and inadequate study and lounge space for its students. Significantly, in 2008, GWU was the only medical school (among 129 LCME accredited institutions) to be placed on probation and the first in fifteen years.

GW implemented a plan to rectify these problems. Its probationary status was lifted in February 2010. Subsequently, the two top GWU medical school administrators were forced to resign over the alleged conflicts of interest.

== Notable people ==
Notable Alumni of the GW School of Medicine & Health Sciences

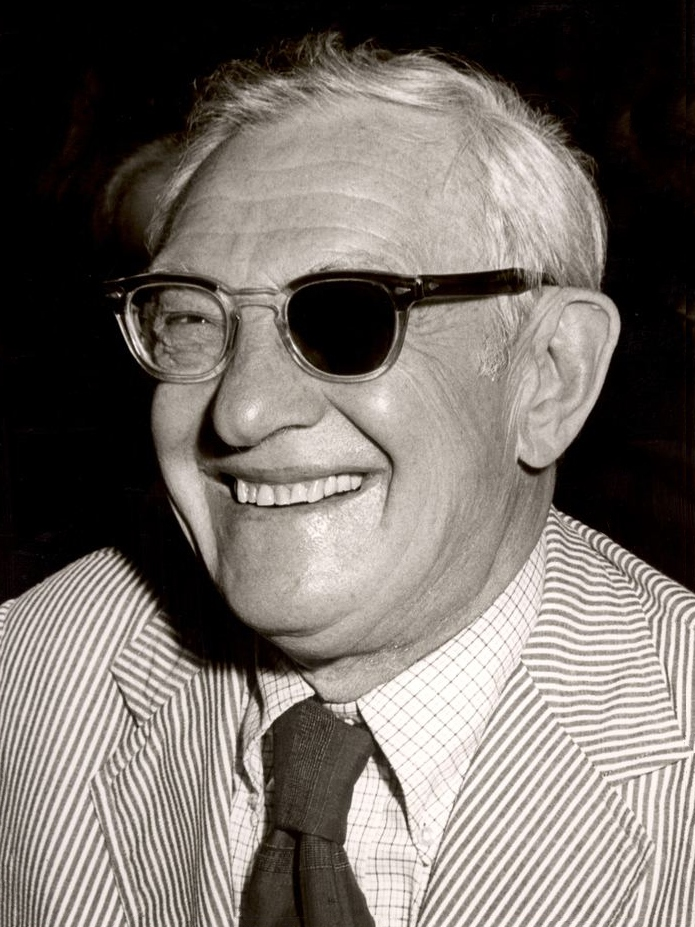
Julius Axelrod, winner of the 1970 Nobel Prize in Physiology or Medicine

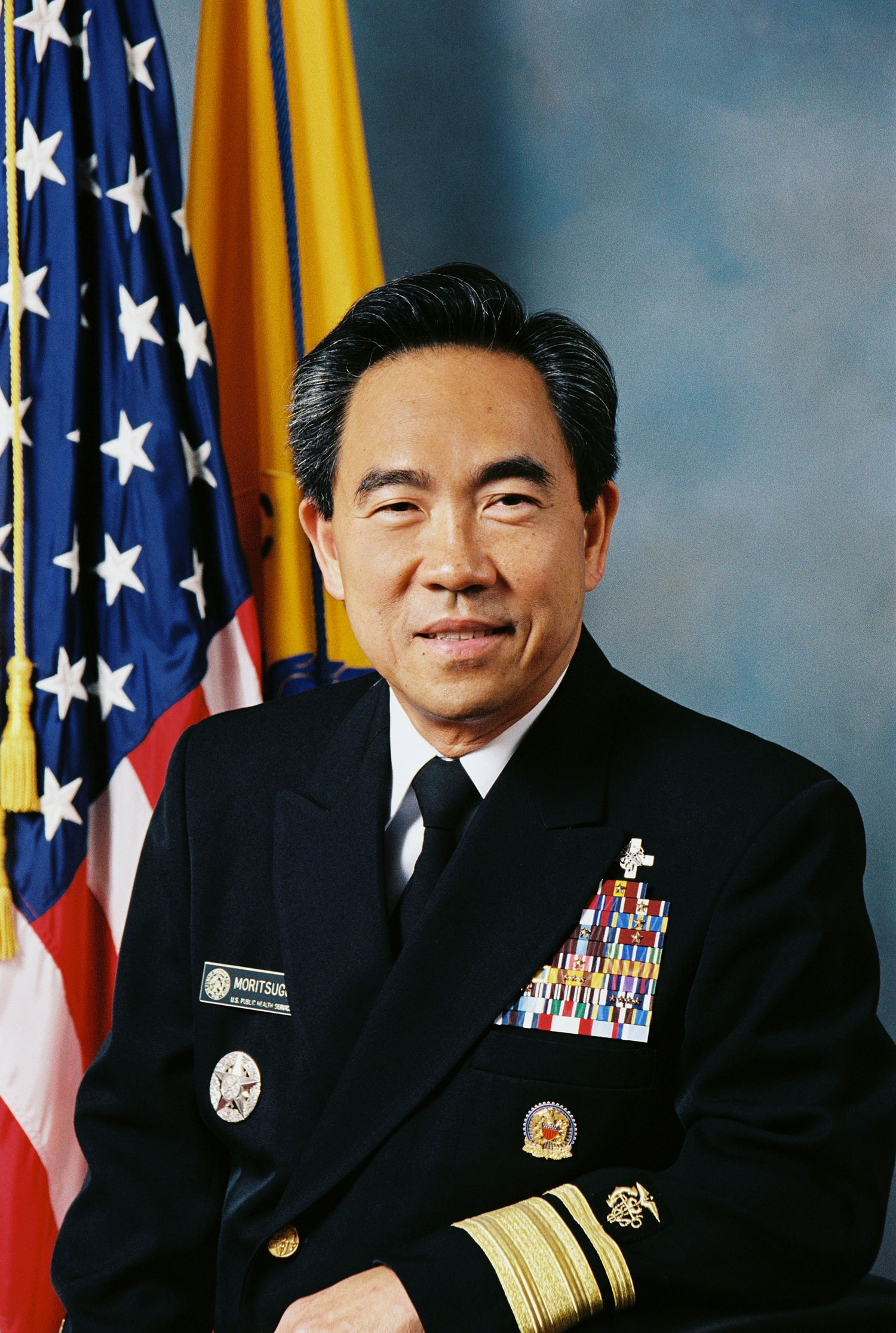
Kenneth P. Moritsugu, U.S. Surgeon General

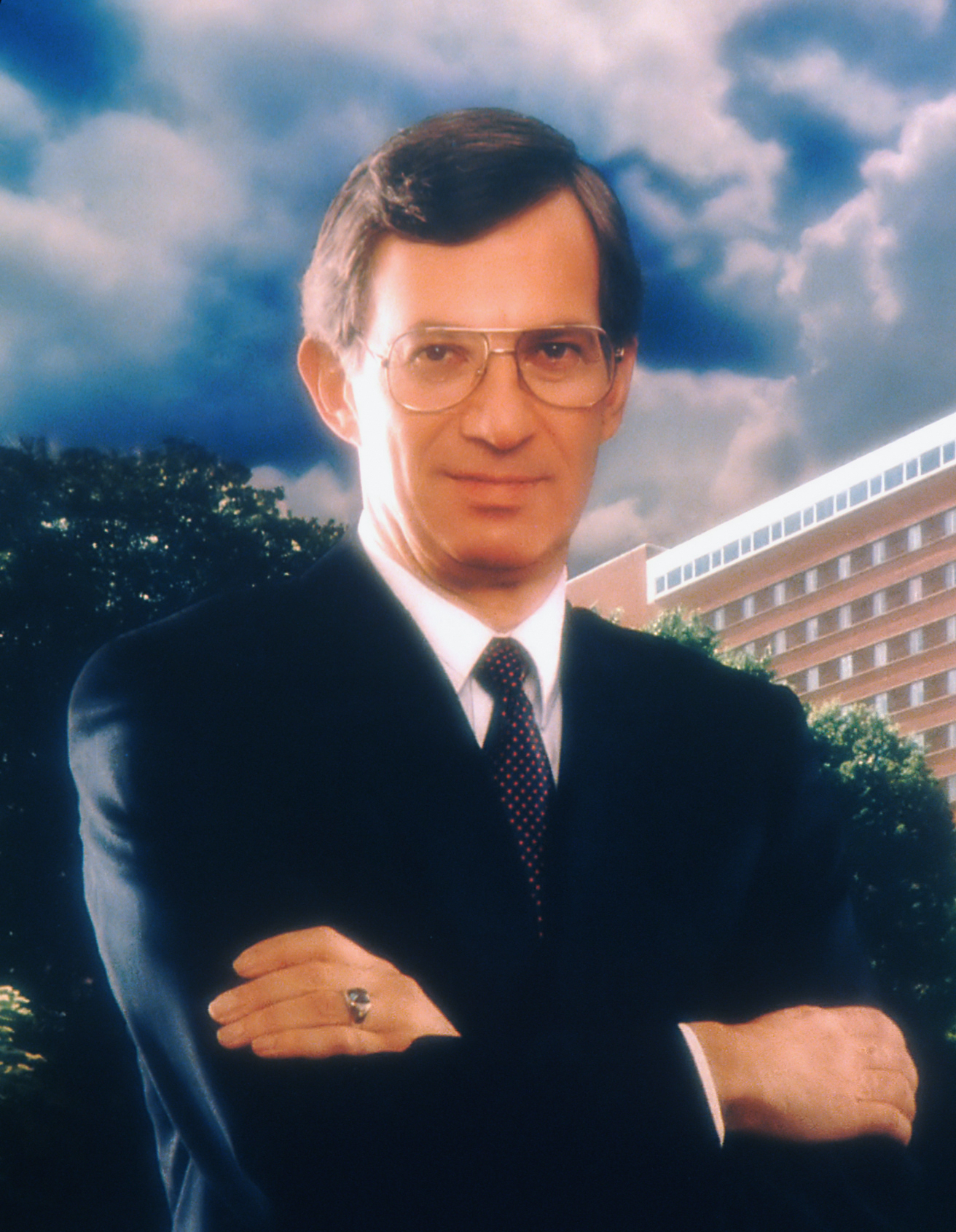
Vincent T. DeVita, president of the board of directors of the American Cancer Society

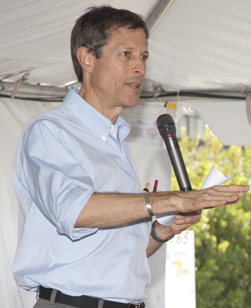
Neal D. Barnard, founder of the Physicians Committee for Responsible Medicine

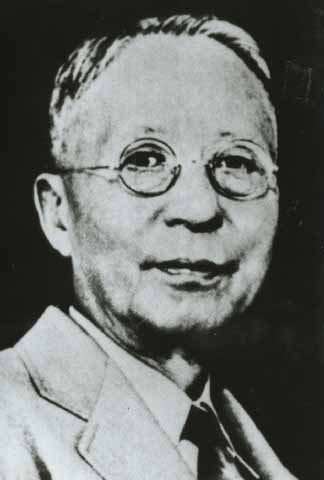
Soh Jaipil, leader of the Korean independence movement

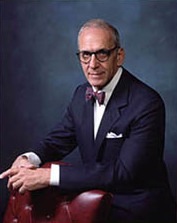
James I. Ausman, editor-in-chief of Surgical Neurology International

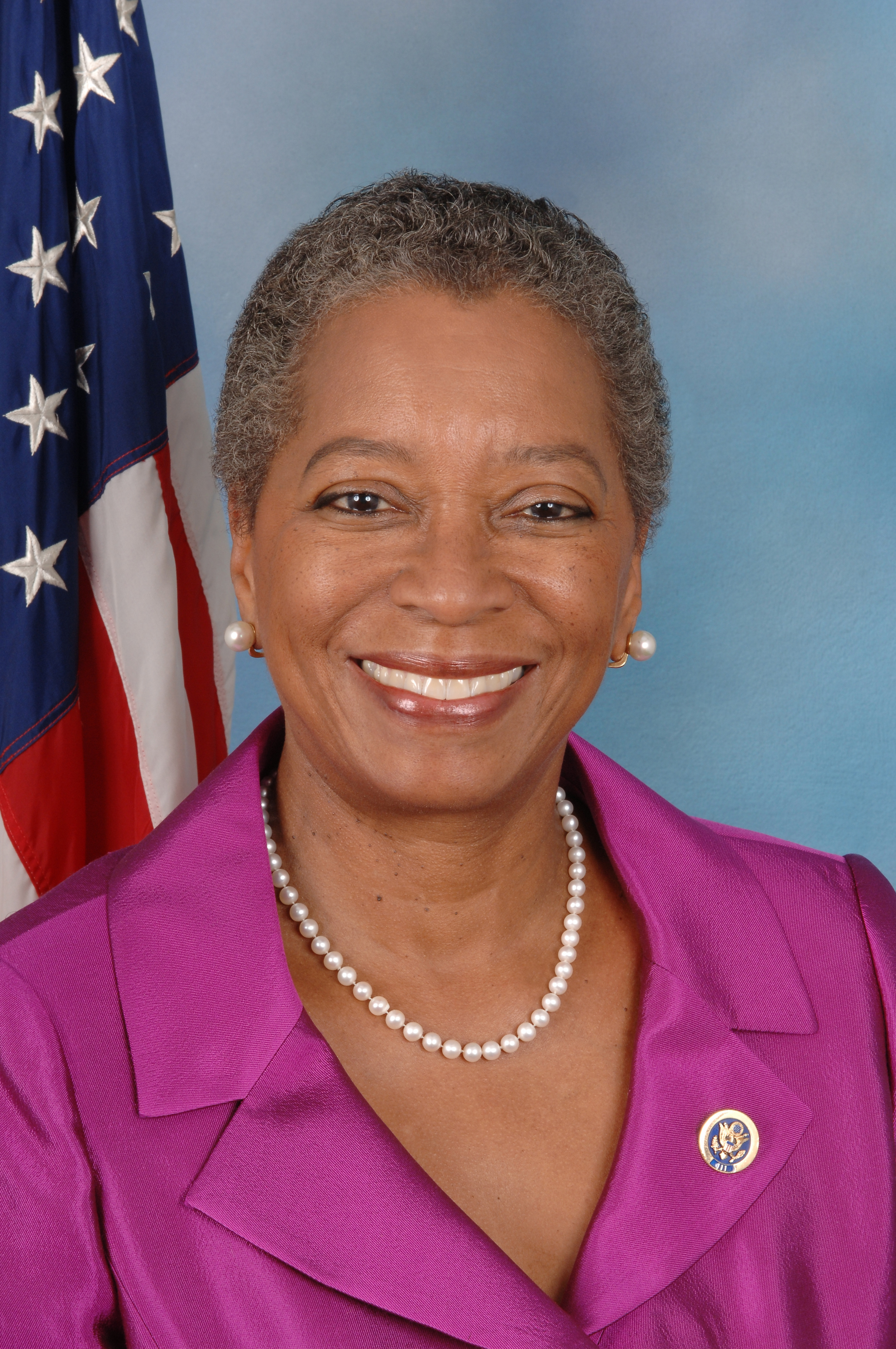
Donna Christian-Christensen, Resident Commissioner of the U.S. Virgin Islands

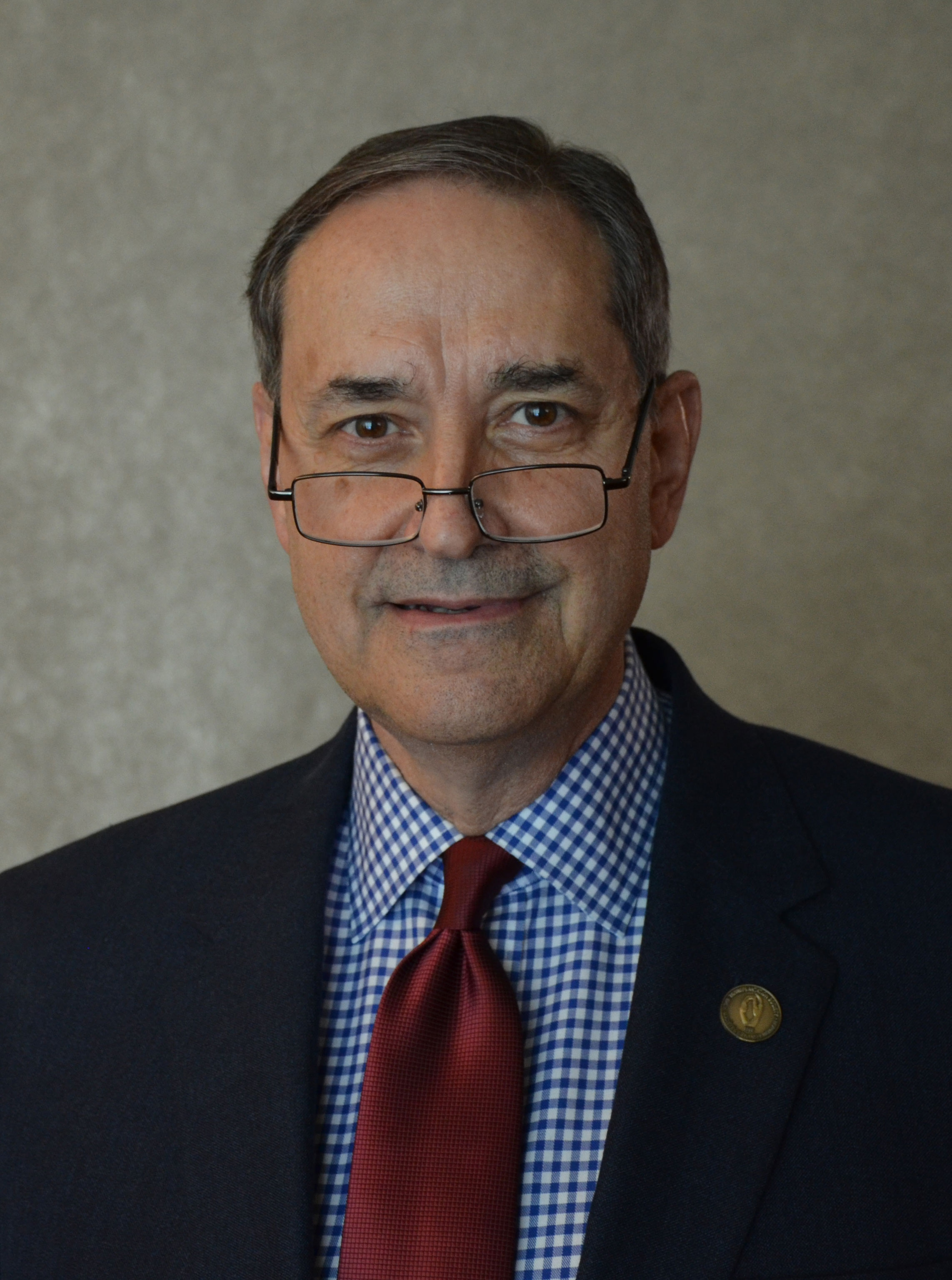
Fancis L. Delmonico, member of the Pontifical Academy of Sciences

=== Notable faculty ===
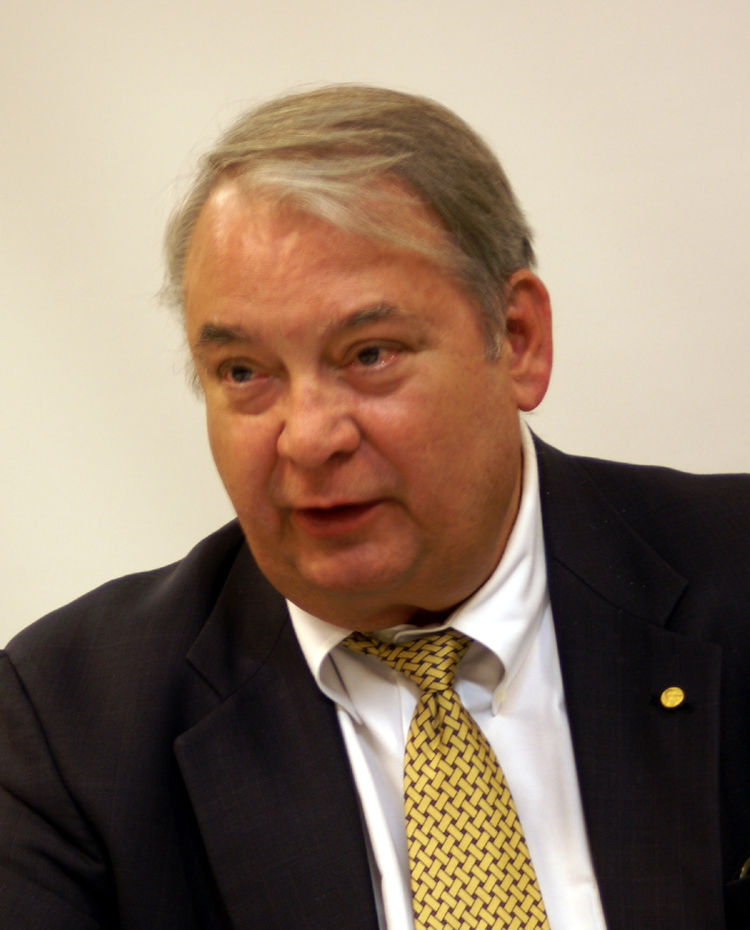
Nobel Prize in Medicine winner Ferid Murad, an SMHS professor since 2011.

- Rachel Brem (diagnostic radiologist, develops new technologies for diagnosis of breast cancer)
- James Carroll (identified germs as the cause of diseases and changed the course of medicine, worked with Dr. Theobald Smith)
- Peter Hotez (distinguished research professor and professor of microbiology, immunology, and tropical medicine at The George Washington University School of Medicine, and principal scientist and founding director of the Human Hookworm Vaccine Initiative)
- Albert Freeman Africanus King (famous for Manual of Obstetrics that became the national standard)
- Ferid Murad {discovered the role of nitric oxide in the cardiovascular system, winner of 1998 Nobel Prize in Medicine and Physiology}
- Walter Reed (army major who identified that yellow fever was transmitted by mosquitoes rather than direct contact with an infected patient)
- Frederick Russell (introduced typhoid vaccine into the army)
- Thomas Sewall (professor of anatomy)
- Theobald Smith (Identified germs as the cause of diseases and changed the course of medicine, worked with Dr. James Carroll)
- Vincent du Vigneaud (1955 Nobel laureate in Chemistry, head of the Biochemistry Department at the George Washington University School of Medicine)
- Judith L. Rapoport (expert on childhood onset schizophrenia, child psychiatry, attention deficit hyperactivity disorder, and obsessive compulsive disorder)
- Lillian Comas-Díaz (clinical professor of psychiatry and behavioral sciences and specializes in ethnocultural approaches to therapy)
