= Himmelfarb Health Sciences Library =

Library in Washington, D.C., the United States

Coordinates: 38.90042°N 77.05054°W

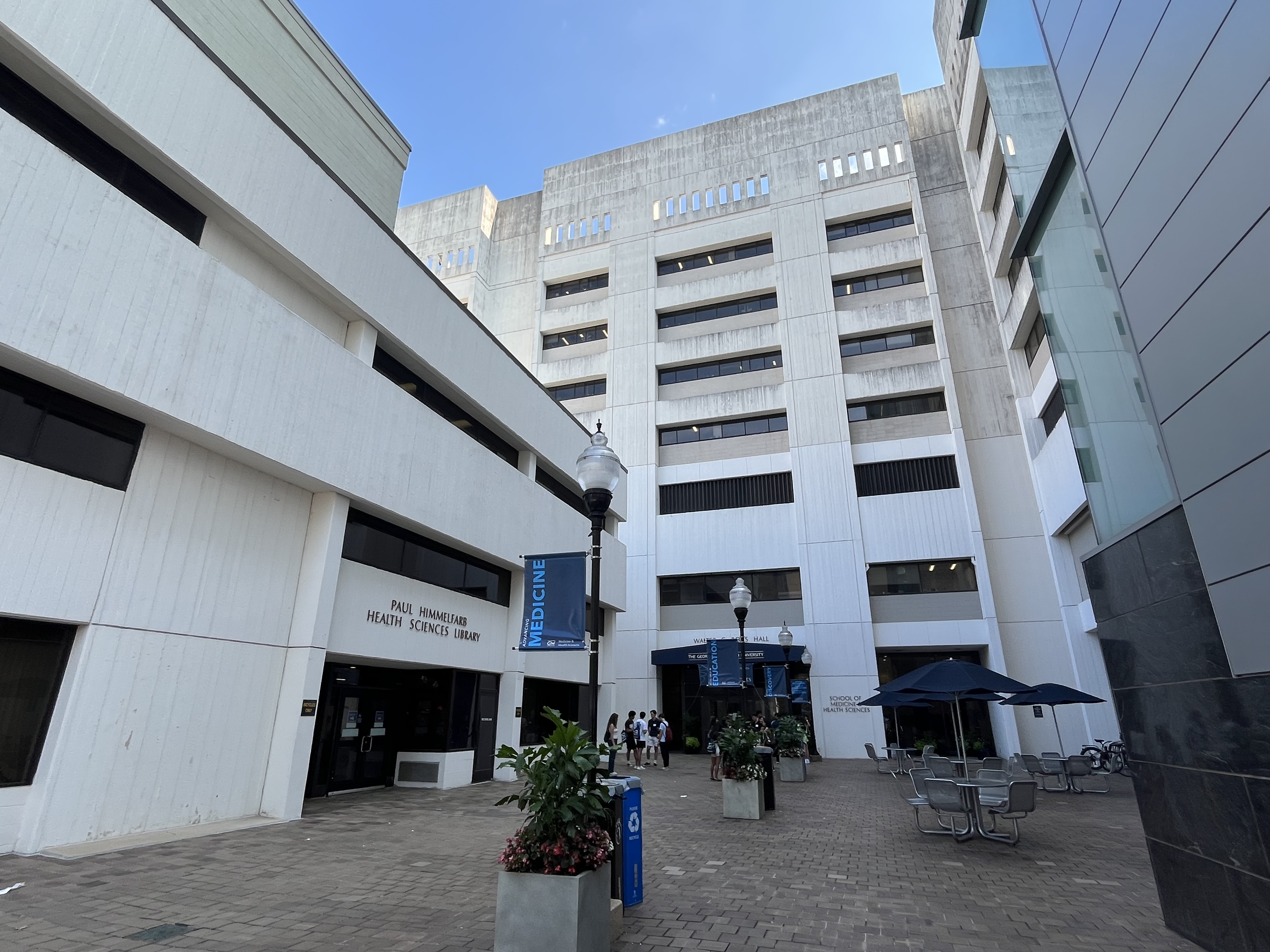
Himmelfarb Health Sciences Library

The Himmelfarb Health Sciences Library was completed in 1973 during the presidency of Lloyd Elliott. The library serves the George Washington University School of Medicine & Health Sciences, the Milken Institute School of Public Health, and the George Washington University School of Nursing. The building is part of the Ross Hall Medical Complex, and has three floors above ground and one below ground. The library was named after Paul Himmelfarb.

North of the Library is the George Washington University Hospital and the Foggy Bottom–GWU Station.
