= Lillian Comas-Díaz =

Psychologist and Professor

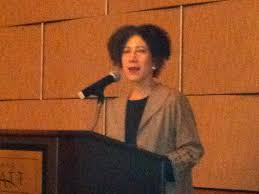
- Education: University of Puerto Rico; University of Massachusetts at Amherst
- Occupation: Psychologist
- Years active: 1980–present

Lillian Comas-Díaz (born July 18, 1950) is an American psychologist and researcher of multiethnic and multicultural communities. She was the 2019 winner of American Psychological Association (APA) Gold Medal Award for Life Achievement in the Practice of Psychology. In 2000, she received the APA Award for Distinguished Senior Career Contribution to the Public Interest.

== Biography ==
Lillian Comas-Díaz was born in Chicago, Illinois, though at the age of six she moved to Puerto Rico, where both her parents are from. They relocated to Yabucoa, which had been recently devastated by a hurricane. In consoling her classmates, she discovered an interest in psychology and healing. She continued to live in Puerto Rico until she was in her twenties. She cites these times of her upbringing as formative to her decision to become a psychologist. After earning her MA she moved to Connecticut, where she did work with local schools and underserved communities. She now works at a mental health institute and as a professor in Washington DC.

== Education and academic work ==
Comas-Díaz earned her BA and MA from the University of Puerto Rico in 1970 and 1973 respectively. She then earned her PhD in clinical psychology from the University of Massachusetts, Amherst in 1979.

In 1984 she began working at the American Psychological Association in the Office of Ethnic Minority Affairs. She has dedicated much of her career to serving underrepresented communities. Comas-Díaz took part in the creation of Division 45 of the APA (Society for the Psychological Study of Culture, Ethnicity, and Race), for which she later acted as treasurer, and as the first editor-in-chief of its journal, Cultural Diversity and Mental Health.

She was previously a member of the Yale University Psychiatry department from 1979 to 1984. Comas-Díaz has been a professor at the George Washington University School of Medicine since 1986. As of 2021, her title is Clinical Professor of Psychiatry and Behavioral Sciences. As of 2021, she also serves at the Transcultural Mental Health Institute, which she founded so she could work with clients across cultures.

In 2019, Comas-Díaz became the first person of color to win the American Psychological Association Gold Medal Award for life achievement in the practice of psychology.

== Research ==
Comas-Díaz has dedicated her work and research to serving people, women especially, across cultures and ethnicities. Much of her work has been to help guide representation and services, and she does so having recognized the limitations of psychology in serving such communities and as being ethnocentric. She credits growing up mixed race as having an impact on her personal and professional development as a clinical, feminist, and ethnocultural psychologist.

One of Comas-Díaz’s general areas of research has to do with developing approaches to racial trauma that employ more culturally competent methods and understandings that acknowledge the roots of the trauma as being linked to sociopolitical and historic events. She explains that in terms of psychotherapy approaches people can go to therapy to learn to develop critical thinking about how one’s trauma has developed outside of themselves and to work to decolonize people’s thinking and deconstruct these systems of oppression.

== Published work ==
Comas-Díaz has published works related to racial trauma and how to address it from ethnocultural and multicultural standpoints. Her publications include Ethnocultural Psychotherapy (1996), Multicultural Care: A Clinician’s Guide To Cultural Competence (2012), and Multicultural Care in Practice (2013).

Ethnocultural Psychotherapy, is an APA training video that shows Comas-Díaz’s ethnocultural approach in practice with a person acting out a client from an actual case. Her book Multicultural Care: A Clinician’s Guide To Cultural Competence was written as a guide to clinicians to help them navigate and practice her multicultural approach to therapy, while also fostering more cultural awareness to better serve clients. Multicultural Care in Practice is another APA training video in which she discusses the importance of cultural competency in informing therapeutic relationships and demonstrates this approach.

Many of her academic articles also explore ethnocultural and sociocultural approaches to therapy, Latinx identity and healing, and feminism.

== Selected publications ==
- Comas-Diaz, L. (1981). Effects of cognitive and behavioural group treatment in the depressive symptomatology of Puerto Rican women. Journal Consulting and Clinical Psychology. 49, 627-632.
- Comas-Diaz, L. (1987). Feminist therapy with Hispanic/Latina women: Myth or reality? Women and Therapy, 6(4), 39-61.
- Comas-Diaz, L., & Greene, B. (eds). (1988). Clinical guidelines in cross cultural mental health. New York: Wiley.
- Comas-Diaz, L. (Eds). (1994). Women of color: Integrating ethnic and gender identities in psychotherapy. New York: Guilford Press.
- Comas-Diaz, L., & Lykes, B., & Alarcon, R. (1998). Ethnic conflict and the psychology of liberation in Guatemala, Peru and Puerto Rico. American Psychologist, 53, 778-792.
- Rayburn, C. & Comas-Diaz, L. (eds.). (2008). WomanSoul: The inner life of women's spirituality. Westport, CT: Praeger.
- Comas-Díaz, L., Hall, G. N., & Neville, H. A. (2019). Racial trauma: Theory, research, and healing: Introduction to the special issue. American Psychologist, 74(1), 1–5.
