= Surgical Neurology International =

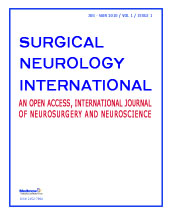
- Discipline: Neurosurgery, neurology, neuroscience
- Language: English
- Edited by: Nancy E. Epstein

Publication details
- History: 2010-present
- Publisher: Scientific Scholar
- Frequency: Weekly
- Open access: Yes
- License: Non Commercial-Share Alike 4.0

Standard abbreviations
- ISO 4: Surg. Neurol. Int.

Indexing
- ISSN: 2229-5097 (print); 2152-7806 (web)
- OCLC no.: 828115830

Links
- Journal homepage; Current articles

Surgical Neurology International is a weekly, peer-reviewed, open access medical journal that was established in 2010 and is published by Scientific Scholar. It publishes original articles, review articles, case reports, technical notes, and editorials regarding developments in the field of neurosurgery and related clinical and basic neurosciences. The editor-in-chief is Nancy Epstein, MD (State University of NY at Stony Brook). In 2018, Epstein was suspended by the American Association of Neurological Surgeons for violating the association's code of ethics.

The journal has been criticized for publishing misinformation about the COVID-19 pandemic, including claiming without evidence that the pandemic was caused by a conspiracy of governments and medical societies and that mRNA vaccines were responsible for thousands of deaths. Several of the journal's editors have been linked to right-wing media, including Miguel Faria, Russell Blaylock, and James Ausman.

== History ==
Surgical Neurology International was established in April 2010 by James I. Ausman, an editor of Surgical Neurology (later renamed World Neurology).

== Abstracting and indexing ==
The journal is abstracted and indexed in Pubmed Central and Scopus.

== Supplements ==
The journal regularly publishes supplements organized around a common theme. Recent issues have covered neuro-oncology, new developments in neurosurgery, stereotactic techniques, spine, neurovascular, neuro-nursing, and pediatric neurosurgery.

== Collaborations ==
The journal collaborates with the Asociación Argentina de Neurocirugía, Sociedade Brasileira de Neurocirurgía, Sociedad Neurocirugía de Chile, Asociación Colombiana de Neurocirugía, Pakistan Society of Neurosurgeons, Federación Latinoamericana de Sociedades de Neurocirugía, and the Sociedad Española de Neurocirugía. Collaboration is also maintained with the following journals: Brazilian Neurosurgery, Neurocirugía Hoy, and the Russian Neurosurgical Journal.
