= Ludwig G. Kempe =

- Born: October 16, 1915 Prenzlau, Brandenburg, Germany
- Died: June 22, 2012 (aged 96) Pisgah National Forest
- Occupation: author, illustrator
- Subject: Neurosurgery, ornithology, surgery
- Spouse: Louise Gwin Clarke

Ludwig G. Kempe (October 16, 1915 – June 22, 2012) was an American neurosurgeon, author and illustrator.

He was an author of books in the field of neurosurgery and ornithology Along with Russell Blaylock, Kempe published a novel transcallosal approach to excising intraventricular meningiomas of the trigone, as well as developing the ventriculolymphatic shunt in the treatment of hydrocephalus.

== Publications ==
- 2004. Kempe's Operative Neurosurgery, Volume 1. ISBN 0-387-98537-9, ISBN 978-0-387-98537-4
