= Russell Blaylock =

American neurosurgeon and conspiracy theorist

Russell L. Blaylock
- Born: November 15, 1945 (age 80)
- Education: LSU School of Medicine, Medical University of South Carolina
- Occupations: Neurosurgeon (retired), writer, lecturer

Russell L. Blaylock (born November 15, 1945) is an American writer and retired neurosurgeon.

Blaylock was a clinical assistant professor of neurosurgery at the University of Mississippi Medical Center. In 2013 he was a visiting professor in the biology department at Belhaven College.

Blaylock has endorsed views inconsistent with the scientific consensus, including that food additives such as aspartame and monosodium glutamate (MSG) are excitotoxic in normal doses.

== Education and career ==
Blaylock completed his general surgical internship and neurosurgical residency at the Medical University of South Carolina in Charleston, SC. He was licensed to practice Neurological Surgery in North Carolina between May 6, 1977, and December 15, 2006. Along with Ludwig G. Kempe, Blaylock published a novel transcallosal approach to excising intraventricular meningiomas of the trigone. He is retired as a clinical assistant professor of neurosurgery from the University of Mississippi Medical Center, and is currently a visiting professor in the biology department at Belhaven University, a Christian university in Mississippi. He is associated with the Association of American Physicians and Surgeons and was on the editorial board of their journal.

== Allegations of health dangers ==
Blaylock claims that numerous substances are toxic and dangerous at typical use levels even though scientific studies rate them safe at customary exposure levels. He has been quoted several times in media outlets regarding his position that MSG is toxic to the brain. He also states that the widely used artificial sweetener aspartame is toxic and may be the cause of multiple sclerosis. He has additionally cautioned against heavy use of the artificial sweetener Splenda (sucralose). These positions are not supported by scientific consensus or regulatory bodies, as extensive studies support the safety of aspartame, sucralose, and MSG.

== Views on politics ==
Blaylock has called the American medical system 'collectivist' and has suggested that health-care reform efforts under President Obama were masterminded by extragovernmental groups that wish to impose euthanasia. He blamed the purported collectivism of American medicine for the retirement of his friend Miguel Faria. According to Blaylock, the former Soviet Union tried to spread collectivism by covertly introducing illegal drugs and various sexually transmitted diseases into the United States. Schwarcz characterized these positions as "conspiracy theories."

== Views on COVID-19 ==
Blaylock supports various COVID-19 conspiracy theories, writing that, "The COVID-19 pandemic is one of the most manipulated infectious disease events in history, characterized by official lies in an unending stream led by government bureaucracies, medical associations, medical boards, the media, and international agencies" and that the COVID-19 vaccine is a "Dangerous, essentially untested experimental vaccine." He also refers in his writing to "The designers of this pandemic..." In 2020, Blaylock baselessly claimed that wearing face masks helps SARS-CoV-2 enter the brain.
