= World Neurosurgery =

- Discipline: Neurosurgery
- Language: English
- Edited by: Edward C. Benzel

Publication details
- Former name(s): Surgical Neurology
- History: 1973–present
- Publisher: Elsevier
- Frequency: Monthly
- Impact factor: 2.104 (2020)

Standard abbreviations
- ISO 4: World Neurosurg.

Indexing
- ISSN: 1878-8750
- OCLC no.: 565924269

Links
- Journal homepage; Online access; Online archive; Journal page at publisher's website

World Neurosurgery is a monthly peer-reviewed medical journal that was established in 1973 as Surgical Neurology before obtaining its current name in 2010. It is published by Elsevier and is the official journal of the World Federation of Neurosurgical Societies. The editor-in-chief is Edward C. Benzel (Department of Neurosurgery, Cleveland Clinic).

== Editors-in-chief ==
Editors-in-chief have included:

- Paul Bucy (Wake Forest University School of Medicine) and Robert J. White (Case Western Reserve University), 1973-1985
- Eben Alexander Jr (Bowman Gray School of Medicine), 1986-1993
- James I. Ausman (University of Illinois at Chicago and University of California, Los Angeles), 1994-2009
- Michael L.J. Apuzzo (Keck School of Medicine of USC), 2010–2015
- Edward C. Benzel (Department of Neurosurgery, Cleveland Clinic, January, 2015–present

== Abstracting and indexing ==
The journal is abstracted and indexed in:

- Current Contents/Clinical Practice
- BIOSIS Previews
- MEDLINE/PubMed
- Science Citation Index
- Excerpta Medica
- EMBASE
- Scopus

According to the Journal Citation Reports, the journal has a 2020 impact factor of 2.104.
