= James I. Ausman =

American neurosurgeon (born 1937)

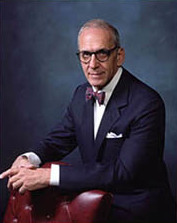
- Born: James Ivan Ausman; December 10, 1937 (age 88); Milwaukee, Wisconsin, United States
- Education: Tufts University, Johns Hopkins Medical School, State University of New York, George Washington University
- Medical career
- Profession: Neurosurgeon
- Research: Neurosurgery, cerebrovascular disease, microsurgery

James Ivan Ausman (born December 10, 1937) is an American neurosurgeon, clinical professor of neurosurgery, and founding editor-in-chief of the medical journal Surgical Neurology International. Ausman is a Clinical Professor of Neurosurgery at the University of California, Los Angeles (UCLA) and is the Emeritus Editor-in-Chief of the Surgical Neurology International medical journal.

Ausman is also a supporter of the Tea Party movement, and has publicly expressed opposition to socialized medicine and the Affordable Care Act. As the co-author of the book The China Virus: What is the Truth?, he argued that the COVID-19 pandemic may have been the result of the Chinese Communist Party's actions, either accidental or intentional.

== Biography ==
Ausman was born in Milwaukee, Wisconsin, on December 10, 1937. He attended Milwaukee Country Day School, obtained a BS degree from Tufts University in 1959, and was awarded an M.D. degree from Johns Hopkins Medical School in 1962. After receiving a master's degree in physiology from the State University of New York at Buffalo in 1964, he moved to Chicago and Minneapolis–Saint Paul to pursue training in surgery and neurosurgery. Afterwards, he moved to the National Institutes of Health, where he received a PhD in pharmacology from the George Washington University School of Medicine in 1969. In 1972, he was appointed an assistant professor of neurosurgery and pharmacology at the University of Minnesota.

In 1978, Ausman was named the Chairman of the Department of Neurosurgery at Henry Ford Hospital in Detroit. During this time, he was promoted to secretary of the Society of Neurological Surgeons. From 1991 to 2001, Ausman was head of the Department of Neurosurgery at the University of Illinois at Chicago, where he focused on microsurgery and cerebrovascular surgery, particularly aneurysms, arteriovenous malformations, and bypassing cerebral ischemia. Ausman has written approaches to the pineal region and midline tumors. He has over 200 publications and is credited with more than 80 chapters in different neurosurgical books. He is a clinical professor of neurosurgery at the University of California, Los Angeles.

Ausman is married and has two daughters.

== Editorships and humanitarian ethics ==
From 1994 to 2009, Ausman served as editor-in-chief of Surgical Neurology (later renamed World Neurosurgery). In 2010, he became the founding editor-in-chief of Surgical Neurology International. He has traveled abroad giving lectures on neurosurgery and medical ethics. According to Ramsis F. Ghaly, M.D., Ausman’s approach to patient care and medical ethics was described as focused on humanitarian principles, including prioritizing patient welfare. Ausman is an honorary member of the Brazilian, Argentinean, Chilean, and Peruvian Societies of Neurosurgery, as well as a corresponding member of the German Society of Neurosurgery. Additionally, Ausman lends support to many initiatives through the James I. and Carolyn R. Ausman Educational Foundation, which focuses on topics such as the Venezuelan crisis, and Surgical Neurology International in Rancho Mirage, California. His editorials at Surgical Neurology International include: "What happened to USA health care on the way to socialism" and "Is gun control really about people control?".
