= Lakeside School (Seattle) =

Coordinates: 47.73214°N 122.32753°W

- (Middle School) 13510 1st Avenue Northeast (High School) 14050 1st Avenue Northeast; Seattle, Washington 98125; United States

Information
- Type: Private; Independent
- Motto: Tibi seris, tibi metis (As you sow, so shall you reap)
- Founded: 1919
- Founder: Frank G. Moran
- Locale: Urban
- Head of School: Ryan Boccuzzi
- Faculty: 111
- Grades: 5–12
- Enrollment: 876
- Student to teacher ratio: 9:1
- Colors: Maroon & Gold
- Athletics conference: 3A Metro League (WIAA)
- Mascot: Leo the Lion
- Rival: O'Dea High School, Seattle Preparatory School and The Downtown School
- Newspaper: Tatler; Leo
- Yearbook: Numidian
- Endowment: $260 million
- Annual tuition: $44,730
- Religious Affiliation: None
- Website: www.lakesideschool.org

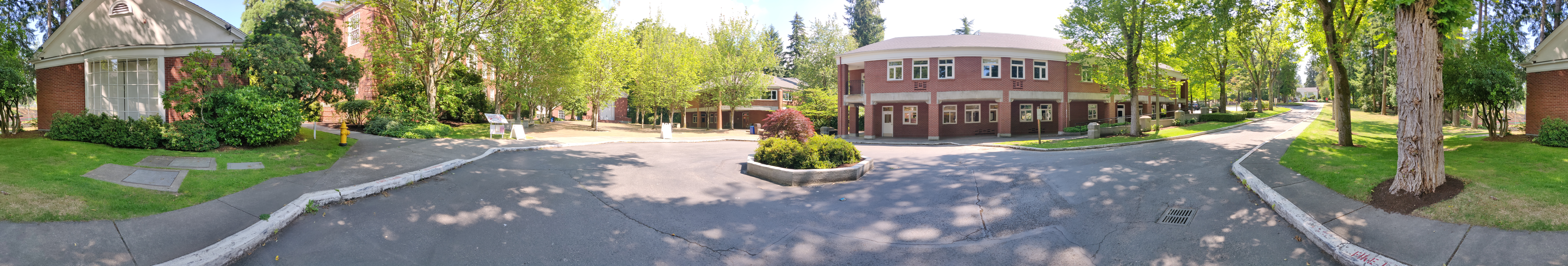
The Lakeside Upper School campus

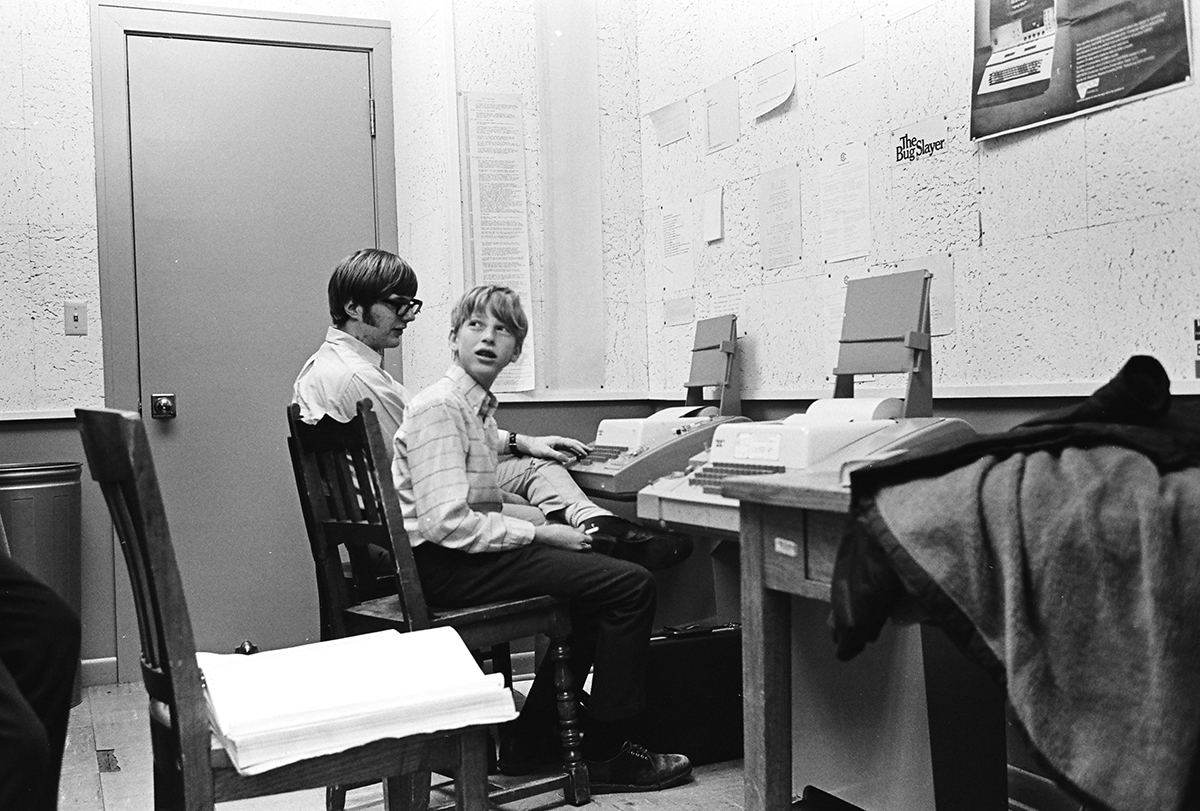
Paul Allen and Bill Gates at Lakeside School in 1970

Lakeside School is an independent, co-educational day school located in Seattle, Washington. It enrolls about 900 students in grades 5 through 12, and is divided into a Middle School (grades 5–8) and an Upper School (grades 9–12).

Founded in 1919, Lakeside has one of the largest endowments among independent schools in the United States, reaching $260 million as of March 2024. It launched one of the earliest continuously operating free summer educational programs in 1965 called the Lakeside Educational Enrichment Program (LEEP), designed to promote diversity by enrolling its first Black students of color. Lakeside offers need-based financial aid to students with family incomes under $250,000. Its alumni include Microsoft co-founders Bill Gates and Paul Allen, Greenpeace USA executive director Annie Leonard, American actor Adam West, Major League Baseball athlete Corbin Carroll, and former Washington governor Booth Gardner.

== History ==
The Moran-Lakeside School was established as an independent preparatory school for boys in 1919 by Frank G. Moran on the shores of Lake Washington in the Denny-Blaine neighborhood of Seattle. The school was intended to feed students to Moran's other school, the Moran School on nearby Bainbridge Island. The school was incorporated in 1923 by a group of parents and renamed to Lakeside Day School. It moved a year later to the present site of The Bush School in Washington Park.

A site near Northeast 145th Street in northern Seattle was selected in 1929 for a new campus for the Lakeside Day School, which had outgrown the Washington Park campus. Four buildings were constructed, including dormitories for 30 students and a refectory. The campus opened on September 4, 1930; a year later, the school was renamed to the Lakeside School. Additional buildings were opened during the 1930s despite low enrollment and mounting debt during the Great Depression; several were later named for students who had died during their World War II military service.

Lakeside adopted stricter academic requirements for admissions in the 1950s and launched a zero-fee summer educational program in 1965 with Seattle Public Schools. The first Black students enrolled through the summer program, called the Lakeside Educational Enrichment Program (LEEP). The formal school uniform was abolished in 1969 by a vote of the student body. By 1971, the boarding program at Lakeside had also ceased. The school became co-educational in a 1971 merger with St. Nicholas School, a Capitol Hill private girls' school. Initially, the Lakeside campus was used by older students from both schools while the St. Nicholas campus was used by younger students. Three new buildings were constructed at Lakeside to complete the full merger.

== Academics ==
Lakeside has an average class size of 17 students, and most humanities classes use the Harkness method. Classes are graded with a mixture of a standard letter grading system and a 4-point grading system, in which an A is worth 4.3 points and an F is worth 2 points. The school does not offer Advanced Placement nor International Baccalaureate courses, stating that their "academic program is designed by our talented educators for our unique student body".

Students who attend Lakeside are required to take courses in English, mathematics, science, history, foreign languages, physical education, health and human development, and the arts. They must also complete a one-week outdoor program and at least 80 hours of community service. Students may independently study subjects in the form of investigations under the supervision of a faculty member.

== Student life ==
Lakeside has over 90 official clubs. The upper school's official newspaper is the Tatler, which also runs Imago, a literary arts publication. Lakeside has affinity groups for various religious, sexual, racial, and ethnic identities, including BSU (Black Student Union), GLOW (Gay Lesbian Or Whatever, a gay-straight alliance club), LAPS (Lakeside Asian/Pacific Islander Students), MIXED (Multicultural Initiators EXperiencing and Encouraging Diversity), and LATISPA (a support network for Latin American students). Several of its clubs such as its Chess Team participate in extracurricular competitions and events, including Model United Nations, Quiz Bowl, Ethics Bowl, Science Bowl, VEX Robotics, and Science Olympiad.

== Athletics ==
Lakeside's athletic program offers golf, football, soccer, volleyball, crew, wrestling, baseball, basketball, ultimate frisbee, tennis, swim and dive, cross country, and track and field as well as a strength and conditioning program. In recent years, the boys' swim team won a 3A WIAA state championship in the 2011–2012 season, the 2012–2013 season, and the 2023–2024 season. The 2013-2014 boys' soccer team won the WIAA state championship in the 3A division. The 2014 girls' swim team won the 3A WIAA state championship for the first time in school history, and won the 2015 state championship as well. The 2016 volleyball team won the 3A WIAA state championship for the first time in school history. The 2021 girls' soccer team won the 3A WIAA state championship for the first time since 2003.

== Notable alumni ==
- Wilber Huston (class of 1929), NASA mission director, Edison Scholar.
- David "Ned" Skinner (class of 1937), former owner of Seattle Space Needle and the Seattle Seahawks.
- Adam West (class of 1946), American film actor, played the original role of Batman in the 1960s TV series.
- Booth Gardner (class of 1954), former Governor of Washington state; former chair of the National Governors Association.
- Edward Ferry (class of 1959), rower who won a gold medal for the coxed pair at the 1964 Summer Olympics.
- Craig McCaw (class of 1968), founder of McCaw Cellular (now part of AT&T Mobility) and Clearwire Corporation.
- Tor Seidler (class of 1968), author of "A Rat's Tale", "Mean Margaret" and "Gully's Travels".
- Frederic Moll (class of 1969), co-founder of Intuitive Surgical, Hansen Medical, Mako Surgical, and Auris Surgical Robots.
- Paul Allen (class of 1971), co-founder of Microsoft and Vulcan Inc.
- Ric Weiland (class of 1971), computer software pioneer and LGBT philanthropist.
- Knute Berger (class of 1972), journalist and writer for Cascade PBS.
- Hal Foster (class of 1973), art critic and historian.
- Bill Gates (class of 1973), co-founder of Microsoft and the Bill & Melinda Gates Foundation. and the 19th richest person in the world (2025)
- Maria Eitel (class of 1980), first president of the Nike Foundation.
- Annie Leonard (class of 1982), executive director of Greenpeace USA.
- Alice Crary (class of 1985), philosopher and distinguished professor at The New School for Social Research.
- Dave Upthegrove (class of 1989), Washington State Commissioner of Public Lands.
- Lianne Nelson (class of 1991), Olympic rower.
- Christopher Miller (class of 1993), American film director, writer, and producer (Project Hail Mary, How I Met Your Mother, The Lego Movie, and the Jump Street franchise).
- Seth Gordon (class of 1994), film director, producer, screenwriter, and film editor (The King of Kong: A Fistful of Quarters, Four Christmases, Freakonomics, Horrible Bosses, Undefeated, Identity Thief, Baywatch).
- Lauren Selig (class of 1994) film producer, entrepreneur and investor (Hacksaw Ridge, Lone Survivor, American Made). Daughter of Martin Selig.
- Marjorie Liu (class of 1996), author and comic book writer (Monstress, NYX, X-23, Dark Wolverine, Astonishing X-Men).
- Duncan Atwood, javelin thrower who qualified for the 1980 and 1984 Olympics.
- Freddie Wong (class of 2004), filmmaker, musician, VFX artist and competitive gamer.
- Daniel Kan (class of 2005), entrepreneur and founder and COO of Cruise Automation (acquired by General Motors for $1b).
- Royce David (class of 2017), multi-platinum music producer.
- Paul Rothrock (class of 2017), Major League Soccer player, forward for Seattle Sounders FC.
- Corbin Carroll (class of 2019), baseball player, 2023 MLB All-Star and NL Rookie of the Year.
