= Da Vinci Surgical System =

Robotic surgical system

da Vinci Surgical System
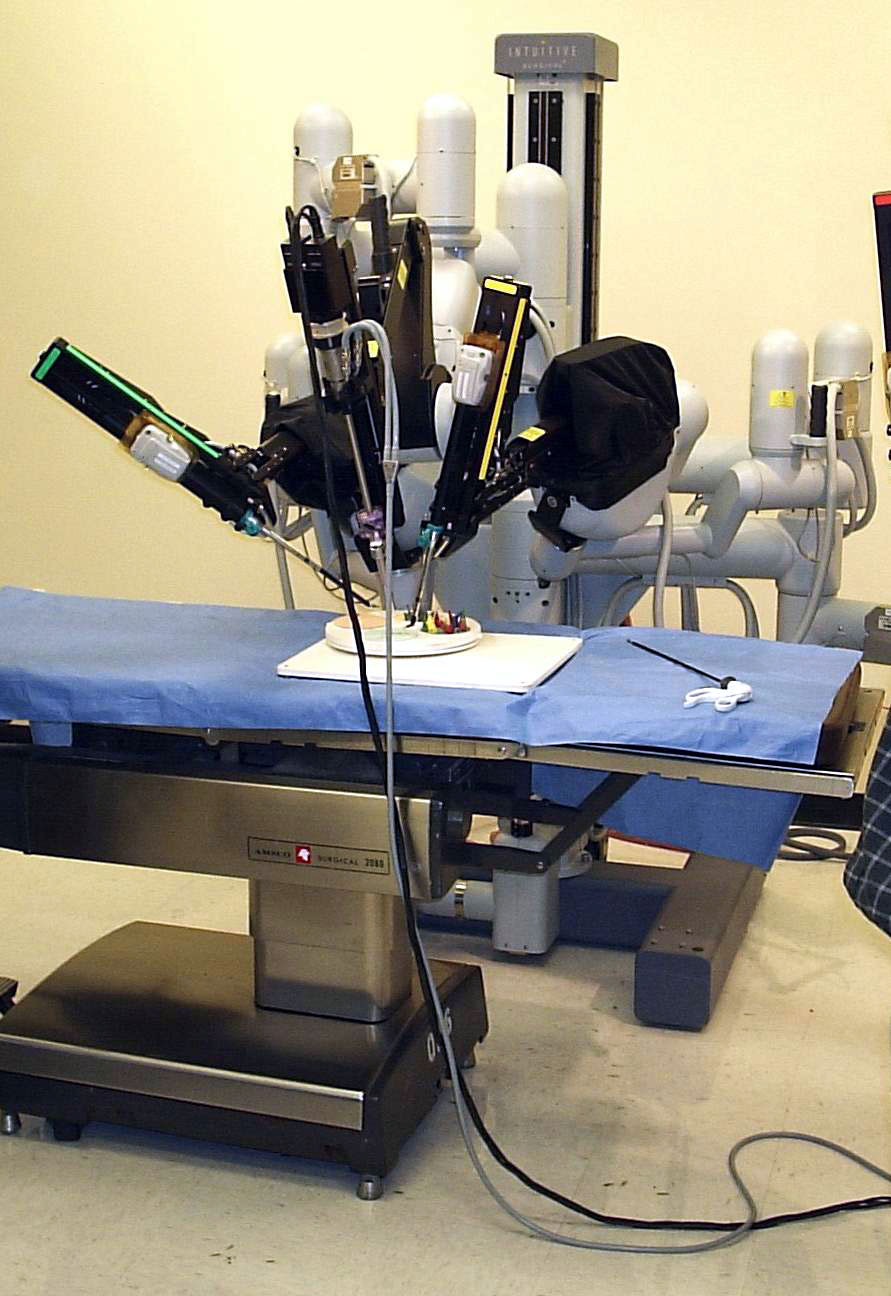
- da Vinci Surgical System
- Manufacturer: Intuitive Surgical
- Country: United States
- Year of creation: 2000; 26 years ago (initial FDA clearance)
- Type: Medical
- Purpose: Medical technology
- Website: www.intuitive.com

The da Vinci Surgical System is a robotic surgical platform that uses a minimally invasive surgical approach and is manufactured by Intuitive Surgical. The system is used for surgical procedures including prostatectomies, cardiac valve repair and renal and gynecologic interventions.

In 2012, it was used in an estimated 200,000 surgeries, most commonly for hysterectomies and prostate removals. The system is called "da Vinci" in part because of Leonardo da Vinci's study of human anatomy eventually led to the design of the first known robot in history.

== Medical uses ==
The system has been used in the following procedures:

- Radical prostatectomy, pyeloplasty, cystectomy, nephrectomy and ureteral reimplantation.
- Hysterectomy, myomectomy and sacrocolpopexy.
- Hiatal hernia and inguinal hernia repair.
- GI surgeries including resections and cholecystectomy.
- Transoral robotic surgery (TORS) for head and neck cancer.
- Lung transplantation: the da Vinci System has been used in the world's first fully robotic surgery of this kind thanks to a pioneering technique.

== Device ==
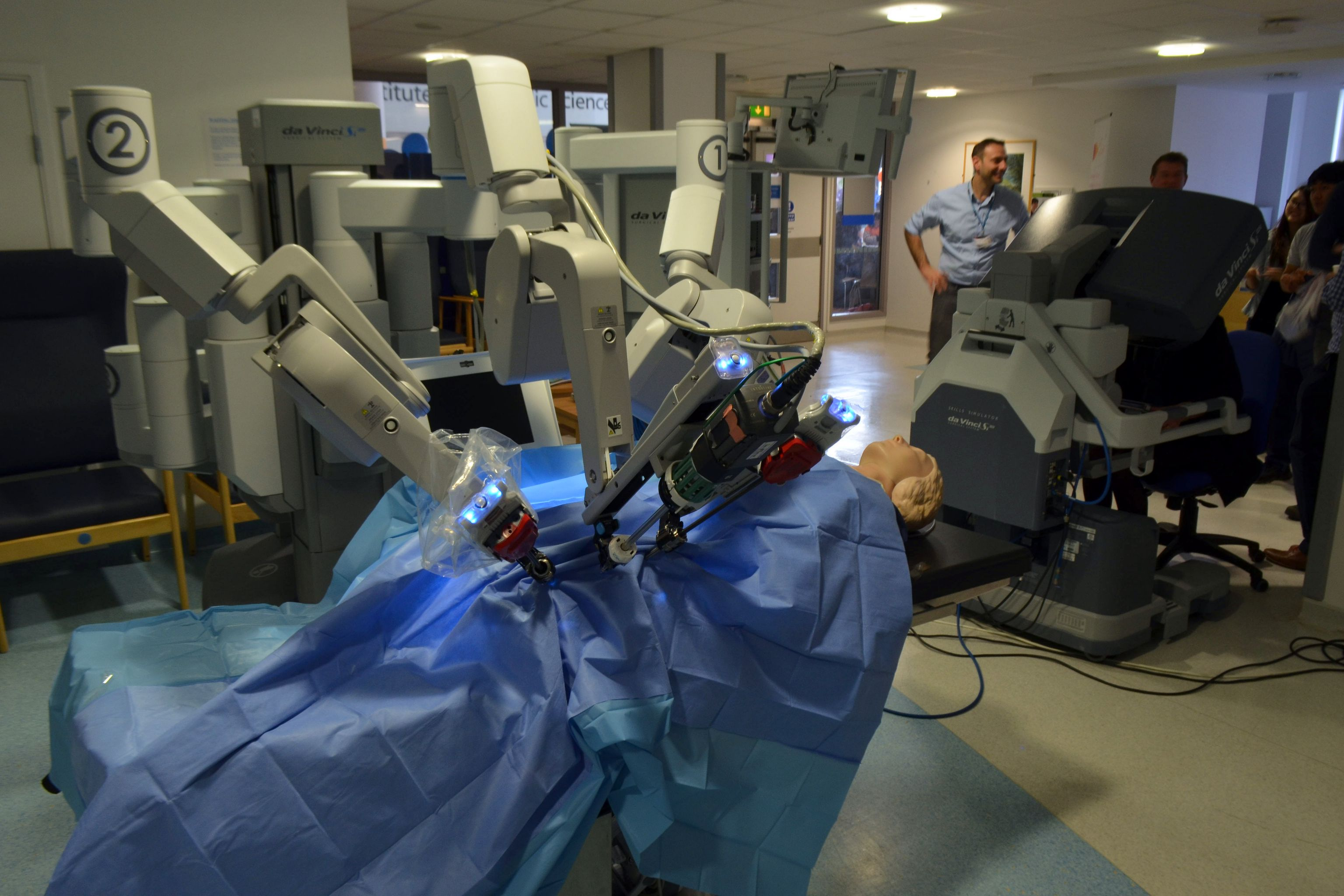
da Vinci patient-side component (left) and surgeon console (right)

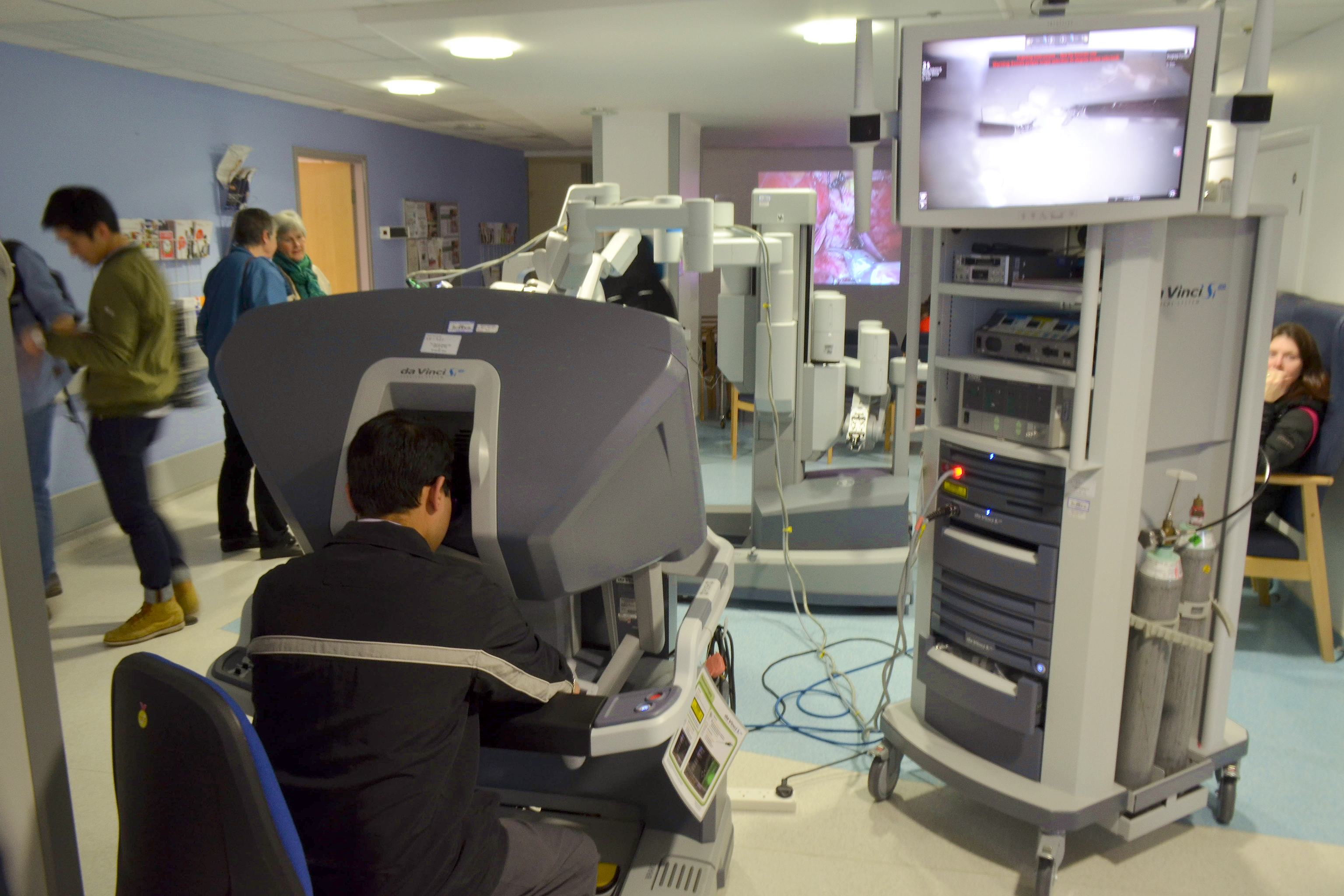
A surgeon console at the treatment centre of Addenbrooke's Hospital

The da Vinci System consists of a surgeon's console that is typically in the same room as the patient, and a patient-side cart with three to four interactive robotic arms (depending on the model) controlled from the console. The arms hold objects, and can act as scalpels, scissors, electrocautery devices, or graspers. The final arm controls the 3D cameras. The surgeon uses the controls of the console to maneuver the patient-side cart's robotic arms. The da Vinci system requires a surgical team to operate and ensure patient safety throughout procedures.

== FDA clearance ==
The Food and Drug Administration (FDA) cleared the da Vinci Surgical System in 2000 for adult and pediatric use in urologic surgical procedures, general laparoscopic surgical procedures, gynecologic laparoscopic surgical procedures, general non-cardiovascular thoracoscopic surgical procedures, and thoracoscopically assisted cardiotomy procedures.

== Criticism ==
While the use of robotic surgery has become an item in the advertisement of medical services, there is a lack of studies that indicate long-term results are superior to results following laparoscopic surgery. Critics of robotic surgery assert that it is difficult for users to learn. The da Vinci System uses proprietary software, which cannot be modified by physicians, thereby limiting the freedom to modify the operating system. The system has a cost of $2 million which places it beyond the reach of many institutions.

The manufacturer of the system, Intuitive Surgical, has been criticized for short-cutting FDA approval by a process known as 510(k) premarket notification instead of entering the market through a more stringent premarket approval process. The company has also been accused of providing inadequate training and encouraging healthcare providers to reduce the number of supervised procedures required before a doctor is allowed to use the system without supervision.

There have also been claims of patient injuries caused by stray electrical currents released from inappropriate parts of the surgical tips used by the system. Intuitive Surgical counters this argument by saying the same type of stray currents can occur in non-robotic laparoscopic procedures. A study published in the Journal of the American Medical Association (JAMA) found that side effects and blood loss in robotically performed hysterectomies are no better than those performed by traditional surgery, despite the significantly greater cost of the system. As of 2013, the FDA was investigating problems with the da Vinci robot, including deaths during surgeries that used the device; a number of related lawsuits were also underway.

== Recognition ==
In 2019, the da Vinci Surgical System received an international recognition during the “Leonardo The Immortal Light” awards, assigned by the International Committee Leonardo da Vinci at the SIO National Medical Congress in Rimini.

== See also ==
- ZEUS robotic surgical system – A robotic surgical system discontinued in 2003
- Sina Surgical System – Iranian surgical system
- Grape surgery
