= 1000 Second Avenue =

493 ft skyscraper in Seattle, Washington

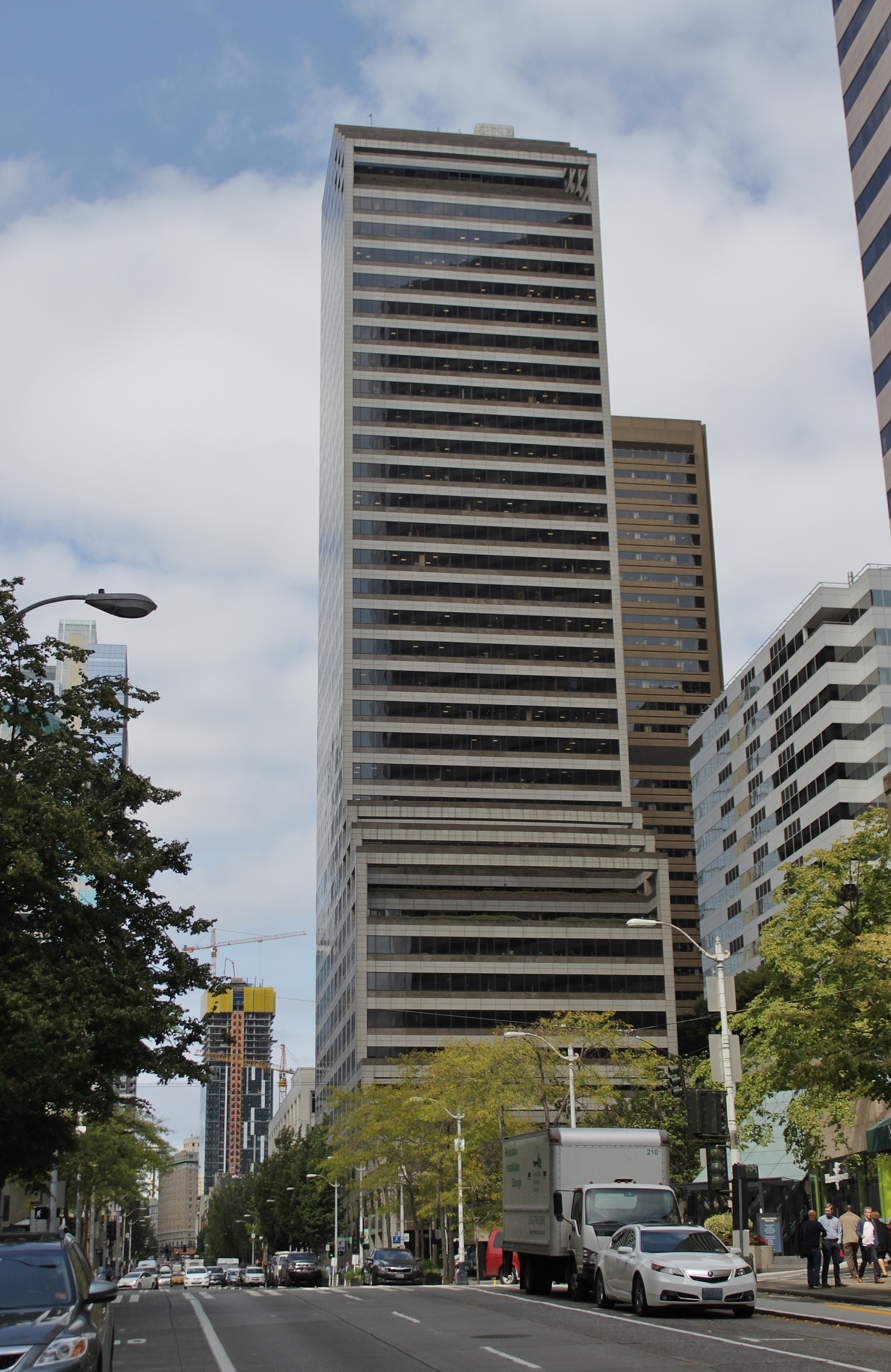

- Location within downtown Seattle
- Former names: Seattle Trust Tower, Key Tower

General information
- Status: Completed
- Type: Office
- Location: 1000 2nd Avenue, Seattle, Washington
- Coordinates: 47°36′20.4″N 122°20′06.4″W
- Completed: 1987
- Owner: Martin Selig Real Estate
- Management: Martin Selig Real Estate

Height
- Roof: 493 ft (150 m)

Technical details
- Floor count: 43
- Floor area: 448,075 sq ft (41,627.5 m^{2})

Design and construction
- Architecture firm: NBBJ
- Developer: Martin Selig Real Estate
- Main contractor: Howard S. Wright Construction

1000 Second Avenue is a 493 ft (150 m) skyscraper in Seattle, Washington. It was completed in 1987 and has 43 floors. Originally named the Key Tower and the Seattle Trust Tower for its largest tenants, it is the 23rd tallest building in Seattle as of 2021.

== History ==
In 1981, a $37 million, 41-story office tower was announced for the site of 2nd Avenue between Madison and Spring streets, sporting an "unusual" curved corner for the entire northwest edge, as well as plazas arranged in receding stacked terraces facing south. The development, planned by Canadian developer Cadillac Fairview and Federal Way-based CHG International, was designed by NBBJ principal Donald Winkelmann and would be built after securing a major tenant. In June 1984, real estate developer Martin Selig announced that he would pay $8.4 million to acquire the project in a property swap with Cadillac Fairview and CHG. The office building would serve as the headquarters of the Seattle Trust and Savings Bank.

Demolition at the site began in November 1984, with a series of fire prevention tests conducted by the Seattle Fire Department inside the vacated United Pacific Building, an 11-story office building constructed in 1909 and donated for the test by Selig. The tests, each 15 to 30 minutes long, took place in prepared environments that simulated fires in high-rise buildings and evacuation protocols. One of the "most significant" of the tests was the monitoring of air pressure in elevator shafts and how this affects keeping smoke out of emergency access areas, as this data was needed for fire code updates.

Upon the building's opening in early 1987, Seattle Trust announced that it was bought out by Key Bank, who renamed the building to Key Tower on July 20. Key Bank announced plans in May 1989 to move out of the building into cheaper space in the new AT&T Gateway Tower; Selig filed suit in court to block the move, alleging that the announcement would "diminish the market price of [the tower]" and that the long-term lease signed by Key Bank had agreed to a move in 1992. The suit was dismissed and Key Bank moved to the AT&T Gateway Tower in 1991.

After the sale of the Columbia Center in 1989 to Seafirst Bank, Selig moved his real estate company's offices to the Key Tower. After the loss of Key Bank, the tower's name reverted to 1000 Second Avenue, which was the name of the Cadillac Fairview project from 1981.

Since 2012, the building has been host to an annual rappelling event to raise funds for the Washington Special Olympics program.

== Major tenants ==
- U.S. Immigration and Customs Enforcement
