= John Freund =

John Freund may refer to:

- John C. Freund (1848–1924), English-American publisher and playwright
- John E. Freund (1921–2004), author of university level textbooks on statistics
- John F. Freund (1918–2001), U.S. Army general
- John Freund (business executive), also a satirist
