= Frederic Moll =

American businessman

Frederic Moll (born 1952) is a physician, medical device developer and entrepreneur, specializing in the field of medical robotics.

== Early life and education ==
Moll's mother and father were both pediatricians. He was raised in Seattle where he attended Lakeside School and was schoolmates with Microsoft cofounders Bill Gates and Paul Allen, graduating in 1969. Moll then attended the University of California at Berkeley where he earned a B.A. degree, before going to the University of Washington to earn his M.D. degree.

== Career ==
During his surgical residency at Virginia Mason Medical Center in the early 1980s, Moll says he was “struck by the size of the incision and injury created just to get inside the body.” He left his residency to develop the safety trocar, which helped make general laparoscopic surgery possible, and funded - and later sold - two medical equipment businesses in Silicon Valley: Endotherapeutics (acquired by United States Surgical) and Origin Medsystems (acquired by Eli Lilly). He also obtained an M.S. degree in business management from Stanford University.

Following its acquisition by Eli Lilly, Origin MedSystem became an operating company within Guidant in 1992. Moll served as medical director of Guidant's surgical division until 1995. During this time, he became certain that robotics could help to make routine surgery less invasive, and in 1995 left Guidant to found Intuitive Surgical with John Freund and Rob Younge. Since this time, Intuitive has worked on developing minimally-invasive, robotic assisted tools and platforms, including the da Vinci system for robotic-assisted surgical procedures.

Moll left Intuitive Surgical in 2002 to become founder & CEO of Hansen Medical, which developed robotic systems for vascular and interventional electrophysiology procedures, and a robotically steered catheter sheath. Hansen Medical received Frost & Sullivan's Product Innovation Award in 2008 for US Image-Guided and Robotic Assisted Surgery Devices.

Moll was a board member of Mako Surgical until its sale in 2013.

Moll co-founded surgical robotics company Auris Surgical Robots, now Auris Health, with Hari Sundram and J.P Velis in 2007. Auris Health's Monarch system is a diagnostic tool that uses robotic-assisted endoscopy. Its application in the earlier and more accurate diagnosis of lung cancer was approved by the FDA in 2018. Johnson & Johnson (J&J) announced its acquisition of Auris Health in February 2019; Moll joined J&J as Chief Development Officer as part of the acquisition, and was involved in the acquisition of Verb Surgical from Alphabet Inc.'s Verily Life Sciences at the end of 2019.

In 2016, Moll joined the board of RefleXion, a medical equipment company developing a biologically guided radiation therapy system for cancer treatment.

Moll was named chairman of the board of Neptune Medical in 2024
