= Lauren Selig =

American film producer

Lauren Selig is an American film producer, businesswoman, writer and philanthropist. She is co-founder of Shake and Bake Productions, VALIS Virtual Reality and Tangled Little Dragon, and has worked in film, television and virtual reality production.

== Early life and education ==
Selig was born in Seattle, Washington, the daughter of property developer Martin Selig. Her mother is Andrea (née Fain).

During elementary school and high school Selig attended the private Lakeside School and Phillips Exeter Academy and went on to her undergraduate studies at Georgetown University where she earned a BS in International Relations. She studied for a year at the London School of Economics while working at Variety. Selig then went on to the University of Washington and Northwestern University where she earned a JD-MBA.

== Career ==
After writing for Variety magazine, Selig worked as story editor in 1997 at DreamWorks for producer Mark Johnson. In 2000 she practiced international licensing for music company Playnetworks.

From 2002, Selig worked at Microsoft in Platforms Business Development. She began working in the family business, and from 2003 to 2012 Selig was Director of Development at her family's company, Martin Selig Real Estate.

Selig co-founded Shake and Bake Productions. Her recent TV series include Wheel of Time and movies include the Elton John biopic Rocketman and the Sam Raimi thriller Crawl. Selig was executive producer of Hacksaw Ridge, Lone Survivor, Everest, American Made, A Walk Among the Tombstones, and I Am Michael, which screened at the Sundance Film Festival in 2015. That year she was named as one of Variety magazine's "producers to watch".

In 2017, Hacksaw Ridge, executive-produced by Selig, received six Oscar nominations.

She is a producer on the last Stanley Kubrick script The Downslope, the sci-fi film The Diamond Age and the Amazon series Wheel of Time.

In addition to her work in film and television she has advised companies on investments into the United States and is a partner at the virtual reality company V.A.L.I.S. which won an Emmy for its work on Capturing Everest. VALIS produced the TIME recreation of Martin Luther King.

Selig has also participated in international forums and public discussions on technology and media, including the World Government Summit, where she took part in discussions on global media, storytelling, and innovation.

She has also participated in academic and industry events, including the Milken Institute Global Conference.

In 2026, Selig led an investment in space technology company Starcloud through Manhattan West and joined the company as an advisor. She was appointed to the board of directors of Renatus Tactical Acquisition Corp. I in July 2026, where she also serves on the Audit, Compensation, and Nominating and Corporate Governance committees. In August 2026, she was appointed to the board of Complete Genomics, with the appointment expected to become effective upon completion of the company's pending acquisition by Swiss Rockets AG.

In 2026, Selig co-led investment firm Manhattan West's participation in a $250 million funding round for Starcloud, a company developing orbital data centers, and joined the company as a board observer.

Selig is listed as a member of the XPRIZE Foundation's innovation board. She serves as an advisor to Fermi Explorer.

== Personal life ==
Selig lives in Los Angeles. Her husband Kyril Faenov, General Manager of the SQL Test Group at Microsoft Corporation, died by suicide in 2012.
