= Hansen Medical =

American medical appliances and equipment company

Hansen Medical, Inc.
- Type: Intravascular Robotics
- Traded as: Nasdaq: HNSN
- Industry: Medical Appliances & Equipment
- Founded: 2002
- Founder: Frederic Moll
- Successor: Auris Surgical Robotics
- Headquarters: Mountain View, California, U.S.
- Key people: Cary Vance (CEO)
- Products: Sensei Robotic System and Magellan Robotic System
- Website: www.hansenmedical.com

Hansen Medical, Inc, headquartered in Mountain View, California, designs and manufactures medical robotics for positioning and control of catheter-based technologies. Founded in 2002 by Frederic Moll, M.D., Hansen Medical develops tools that manipulate catheters by combining robotic technology and computerized movement. Some notable products include the Magellan Robotic System and the Sensei Robotic System.

== History ==
In 2005, Hansen bought EndoVia Medical Inc., a medical robotics company.

Later that year, Hansen Medical and Intuitive Surgical, another company founded by Moll, entered into a cross-licensing agreement that included Hansen's portfolio of 50 issued and pending patents and patent applications and Intuitive's 250 issued patents related to minimally invasive instruments and surgical robotics. The agreement gave Intuitive Surgical an equity stake in Hansen and royalties on the future sales of Hansen Medical products. The full financial terms of the agreement were not made public.

Hansen Medical went public in 2006, raising $75 million in its initial public offering with two catheter systems under FDA review. The shares represented about 30% of the company.

In July 2016, it was acquired by Auris Surgical Robotics in an $80 million merger.
