= Modern (Seattle building) =

Mixed-use high-rise building in Seattle, Washington, United States

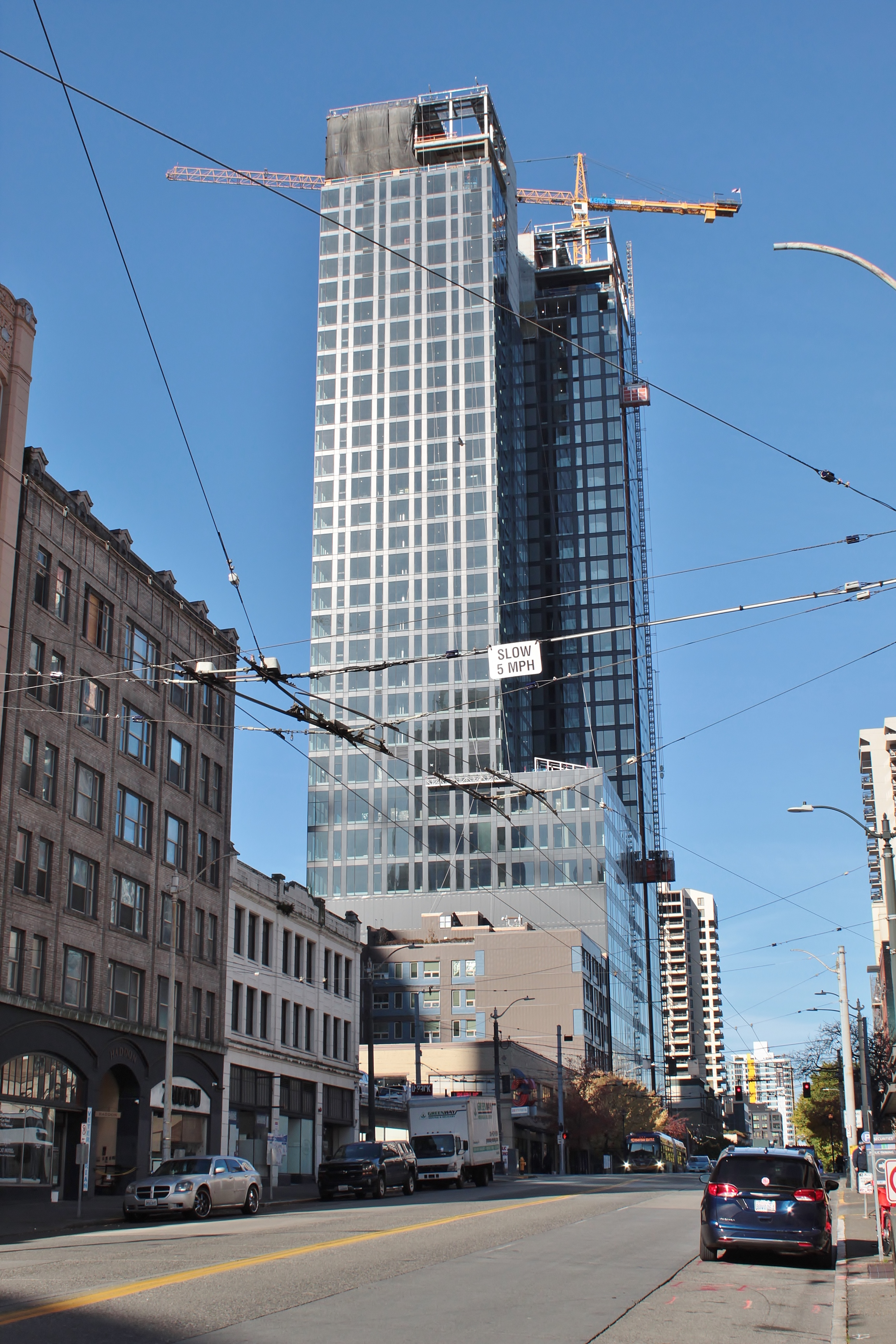
- Under construction in October 2019
- Interactive map of the Modern area
- Former names: Third and Lenora

General information
- Status: Completed
- Type: Mixed use
- Location: 2031 3rd Avenue; Seattle, Washington, US
- Coordinates: 47°36′46″N 122°20′32″W
- Construction started: September 2017
- Topped-out: August 2019
- Completed: 2020

Height
- Architectural: 440 ft (130 m)
- Top floor: 440 ft (130 m)

Technical details
- Floor count: 38
- Floor area: 700,000 square feet (65,000 m^{2})

Design and construction
- Architecture firm: Perkins and Will
- Developer: Martin Selig Real Estate
- Civil engineer: KPFF Consulting Engineers
- Main contractor: Lease Crutcher Lewis

Other information
- Number of units: 222 apartments
- Parking: 221 spaces

Website
- 3rdandlenora.com

The Modern (formerly Third and Lenora) is a mixed-use high-rise building in the Belltown neighborhood of Seattle, Washington, United States. The 38-story tower, developed by Martin Selig, includes offices, retail, and 222 residential units. Construction began in September 2017 and was completed in 2020. It was originally leased to The We Company for use by their WeWork co-working and WeLive co-living ventures until the company ran into financial issues and the lease was terminated after the building was topped out.

== History ==
Martin Selig Real Estate announced its intention to build a 36-story residential and office tower in October 2014, shortly after purchasing three buildings on 3rd Avenue near Lenora Street for a total of $16.9 million. One of the block's buildings housed the Jewish Federation of Greater Seattle and was the site of a shooting in 2006.

The mixed-use project initially had 140 luxury apartments and 13 floors of office space, but was changed to 384 market-rate apartments and 9 floors of offices during design review. The downtown design review board approved the revised design in March 2016. Co-working company WeWork was announced as the building's main tenant in September by Selig, and confirmed in August 2017. WeWork was planned to occupy 200,000 square feet (19,000 m^{2}) of office space on the lower nine floors, while the upper 23 floors would have 384 co-living residential units under the WeLive brand.

The city government approved the design of Selig's Third and Lenora project in April 2017, with no major conditions or changes. The owner of a nearby printing shop filed an appeal of the city's design approval over the width of the tower, measuring 178 feet (54 m) facing 3rd Avenue, but the hearing examiner declined to take action. The three buildings on the site were demolished in August 2017 and construction of the Third and Lenora building began a month later under the direction of general contractor Lease Crutcher Lewis.

The building was topped out in August 2019 with the completion of steel framing for the two-story penthouse and amenities center. In October 2019, Martin Selig Real Estate announced that its lease with WeWork would be terminated by mutual agreement amid the latter's financial situation following its cancelled initial public offering. Selig stated that he would continue to work on the near-complete building, which was originally scheduled to open in late 2020. The opening was pushed back to late 2021 due to the COVID-19 pandemic and additional work required to convert the WeLive units to 222 apartments. A children's play area is planned for the 12th floor as part of the conversion to larger apartments for families. The project was renamed the "Modern" in late 2020.

Leasing of the residential units began in 2022 while the office portion remained vacant. A proposal to convert the office portion into 160 residential units on eight floors was filed by Selig in January 2024.

The Modern was the subject of a deed in lieu of foreclosure, a process by which Selig lost ownership of the property, on May 8, 2025. Selig's company had about $235 million in debt associated with the building.

== Design ==
The Modern was designed as a mixed-use development with 38 stories and a total of 700,000 square feet (65,000 m^{2}) of space. It has 5,500 square feet (510 m^{2}) of retail space, 176,500 square feet (16,400 m^{2}) of offices on nine floors, and 222 residential units. The building has a five-level underground parking garage with 221 spaces. The top two floors of the building are an amenity space for residents with a gym and a "conservatory". The project was designed by Perkins and Will and features a large setback above the 12th floor and a mid-level terrace to separate the office and residential floors.
