= ZEUS robotic surgical system =

System for minimally invasive microsurgery

ZEUS Robotic Surgical System
- Manufacturer: Computer Motion
- Type: Robotic surgery

The ZEUS Robotic Surgical System (ZRSS) was a medical robot designed to assist in surgery, originally produced by the American robotics company Computer Motion. Its predecessor, AESOP, was cleared by the Food and Drug Administration in 1994 to assist surgeons in minimally invasive surgery. The ZRSS itself was cleared by the FDA seven years later, in 2001. ZEUS had three robotic arms, which were remotely controlled by the surgeon. The first arm, AESOP (Automated Endoscopic System for Optimal Positioning), was a voice-activated endoscope, allowing the surgeon to see inside the patient's body. The other two robotic arms mimicked the surgeon's movements to make precise incisions and extractions. ZEUS was discontinued in 2003, following the merger of Computer Motion with its rival Intuitive Surgical; the merged company instead developed the Da Vinci Surgical System.

== History ==
=== AESOP ===
In the 1990s, Computer Motion was a leading producer of medical robotics, manufacturing systems such as the HERMES Control Center and the SOCRATES Telecollaboration System. Computer Motion conducted its original research developing the AESOP arm under a NASA SBIR (Small Business Innovation Research) contract. NASA funded the research in the hope that derivatives of such technology could help service the Space Shuttle in orbit, working on parts of the shuttle where humans cannot easily access or making other delicate repairs or adjustments.

AESOP was cleared for use by the FDA in 1994, and it became the first robot to assist in a surgery. AESOP's function is to maneuver an endoscope inside the patient's body during the surgery. The camera moves based on voice commands given by the surgeon. Voice activation of the AESOP arm allows the surgeon to position the camera while also controlling the other two arms of the ZEUS system. The endoscope can also be controlled by a computer which allows for more precise movements and also allows the endoscope to be inserted into the patient through a smaller incision (a key component of minimally invasive surgery).

=== ZEUS system ===
The first prototype of the ZEUS was demonstrated in 1995, and tested on animals in 1996. Two years later, in 1998, it carried out its first tubal re-anastomosis procedure, and its first coronary artery bypass surgery (CABG) procedure. By 2000, the ZEUS was equipped to hold 28 different surgical instruments, and in 2001 it received FDA approval. In 2003, the ZEUS Robot Surgical System was marketed at $975,000. This was slightly cheaper than the competing Da Vinci system, which sold for $1 million.

=== Computer Motion vs. Intuitive Surgical ===
By 2000, Computer Motion had filed eight lawsuits against a rival medical robotics company, Intuitive Surgical, for allegedly infringing on Computer Motion's patents relating to robotic surgery.

On March 7, 2003, Computer Motion and Intuitive Surgical merged into a single company. This was partially done to try to end the litigation between the companies, but also to combine their efforts in developing robotic surgical systems to increase the effectiveness of such technology. Soon after merging, the ZEUS was phased out in favor of Intuitive Surgical's Da Vinci system.

== Features ==
The ZEUS was designed for minimally invasive microsurgery procedures, such as beating heart surgery and endoscopic coronary artery bypass grafting (E-CABGTM). The system was also used to initiate more complex procedures, like a mitral valve surgery IDE study. The ZEUS' robotic arms not only mimic the surgeon's hand movements, but also scale down the movement, allowing the surgeon to easily make precise and small cuts.

The arms also correct for tremors in a surgeon's hands, which are normal even without fatigue, though a highly trained surgeon will be able to lessen the negative effects. However, some surgeries can last for hours, in which case the surgeon's arms will get tired, and the resulting tremors from fatigue can make the surgeon create false cuts, which can be devastating during a delicate operation. To handle this, the ZEUS is designed to track and nullify these tremors while still responding to the movements/commands of the surgeon's hands.

During the surgery, the surgeon sits at the ZEUS console to control the arms. This can also lessen fatigue, because the surgeon is sitting down during the long operation rather than leaning over the patient.

The ZEUS is also able to perform remote surgery. Because the surgeon is simply controlling the robotic arms, the surgeon can sit at a ZEUS console remote from where the surgery is actually taking place, and still be able to perform the surgery.

== Timeline of use ==
- December 1, 1998 – Computer Motion Inc. and United States Surgical Corp. agreed to develop and market robotic heart surgery devices using ZEUS.
- 1998 – Dr. Frank Diamiano performed the first procedure in the United States with a reanastomosis of a fallopian tube using ZEUS.
- September 24, 1999 – Dr. Boyd of London Health Sciences Centre's (LHSC) university performed the world's first robotically-assisted closed-chest beating-heart cardiac bypass operation on 60-year-old dairy farmer John Penner using ZEUS.
- November 22, 1999 – The first closed-chest beating-heart cardiac hybrid revascularization procedure is performed at the London, Ontario, Health Sciences Centre. Dr. Douglas Boyd used Zeus to perform an endoscopic, single-vessel heart bypass surgery on a 55-year-old male patient's left anterior descending artery.
- December 9, 1999 – Dr. Ralph Damiano Jr., of the Milton S. Hershey Medical Center at Penn State College of Medicine in Hershey, performed the first robotic-assisted beating-heart bypass in the United States using ZEUS.
- October 9, 2001 – ZEUS received FDA regulatory clearance, following the FDA decision for U.S. surgeons to use a variety of instruments to perform a wide range of robotically assisted laparoscopic and thoracic procedures.
- 2003 – Following the merger of Computer Motion and Intuitive Surgical, ZEUS was phased out in favor of the Da Vinci Surgical System.

== See also ==
- sina Surgical System
