= Columbia Center =

Skyscraper in Seattle, Washington

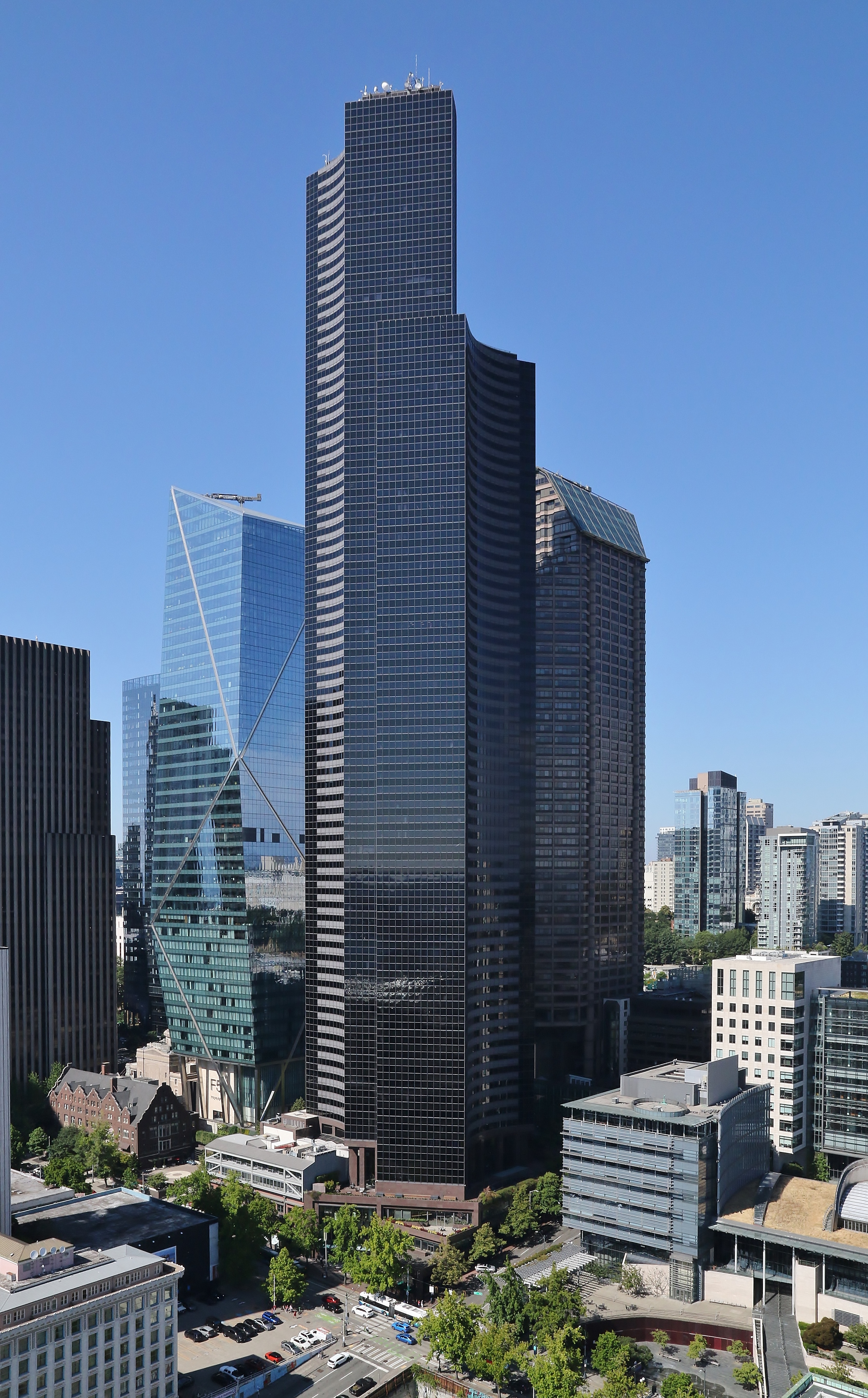
- Seen from Smith Tower in July 2026

- Location within Downtown Seattle
- Former names: Bank of America Tower; Columbia Seafirst Center

Record height
- Tallest in Seattle and Washington state since 1985^{[I]}
- Preceded by: Safeco Plaza

General information
- Type: Commercial offices
- Location: 701 Fifth Avenue; Seattle, Washington, U.S.
- Coordinates: 47.60453°N 122.33069°W
- Construction started: 1982
- Completed: January 12, 1985
- Opened: March 2, 1985
- Cost: US$200 million (approx. $599 million in 2025 dollars)
- Owner: Gaw Capital Partners

Height
- Architectural: 933 ft (284 m)
- Tip: 967 ft (295 m)
- Roof: 937 ft (286 m)
- Observatory: 902 ft (275 m)

Technical details
- Floor count: 76 (76 & 7 below ground)
- Floor area: 1,538,000 sq ft (142,900 m^{2})
- Lifts/elevators: 48

Design and construction
- Architect: Chester Lindsey Architects
- Developer: Martin Selig
- Structural engineer: Magnusson Klemencic Associates (formerly Skilling Helle Christiansen Robertson)
- Main contractor: Howard S. Wright Construction

Website
- columbiacenterseattle.com

The Columbia Center or Columbia Tower, formerly named the Bank of America Tower and Columbia Seafirst Center, is a skyscraper in downtown Seattle, Washington, United States. The 76-story structure is the tallest building in the state of Washington, reaching a height of 933 ft (284 m). At the time of its completion in 1985, the Columbia Center was the tallest structure on the West Coast; as of 2017, it is the fourth-tallest, behind buildings in Los Angeles and San Francisco.

The Columbia Center, developed by Martin Selig and designed by Chester L. Lindsey Architects, began construction in 1982 and was completed in 1985. The building is primarily leased for class-A office spaces by various companies, with the lower floors including retail space and the upper floors featuring a public observatory and private club lounge. The tower has the highest public viewing area west of the Mississippi River. It occupies most of the block bounded by Fourth and Fifth Avenues and Cherry and Columbia Streets.

== Design ==
Columbia Center was designed by Washington architect Chester L. Lindsey. The base of the building is clad in Rosa Purino Carnelian granite. The building's structure is composed of three geometric concave facades with two setbacks, causing the building to appear like three towers standing side by side. The floor plates in the building range from 13,603 square feet (1,263.8 m^{2}) on the upper floors to 23,362 square feet (2,170.4 m^{2}) on the lower floors.

Ground level elevation on the Fifth Avenue side of the building is higher than on the Fourth Avenue side; the part of Cherry Street it faces was identified as one of the steepest streets in the Central Business District with a slope of 17.1%. The tower was originally designed to be about 306.5 m (1,006 ft), but federal regulations by the Federal Aviation Administration (FAA) would not allow it to be that tall so close to the nearby Sea-Tac Airport. Although city land use regulations at the time were intended to limit skyscrapers to about 50 stories, the developer, Martin Selig, obtained the necessary permits for a 76-story skyscraper due to a part of the law that allowed bonus height for providing retail space with street access. Because three separate stories could access the street on the sloped site, the developers were allowed a bonus for each of the three stories they set aside for retail, which was reportedly an unintended loophole in the law.

The Columbia Center has a sky lobby on the 40th floor that is connected by express elevators to the 5th Avenue lobby; it formerly had a public Starbucks. An observation deck on the 73rd floor, named the Sky View Observatory, offers views of Seattle and environs. It is connected by a direct elevator from the 4th Avenue lobby. An underground concourse connects the building's second floor to the nearby Seattle Municipal Tower and 800 Fifth Avenue. The top two floors of the building (75th and 76th) are occupied by the private Columbia Tower Club, which houses a restaurant, bar, library, and meeting rooms. It opened in 1985 and is scheduled to close in April 2026.

The tower, originally proposed as Columbia Center, opened under the name Columbia Seafirst Center after its largest tenant and financier, Seafirst Bank, and then changed to the Bank of America Tower, when Seafirst, which had been owned by Bank of America since 1983, was fully integrated into Bank of America. That name gave it the nickname "BOAT" (Bank of America Tower). In November 2005, the building's name was changed back to Columbia Center after the bank reduced its presence in the building. Bank of America still maintains office space within the building, but has since closed the bank branch at the base of the tower.

== History ==
=== Development and construction ===
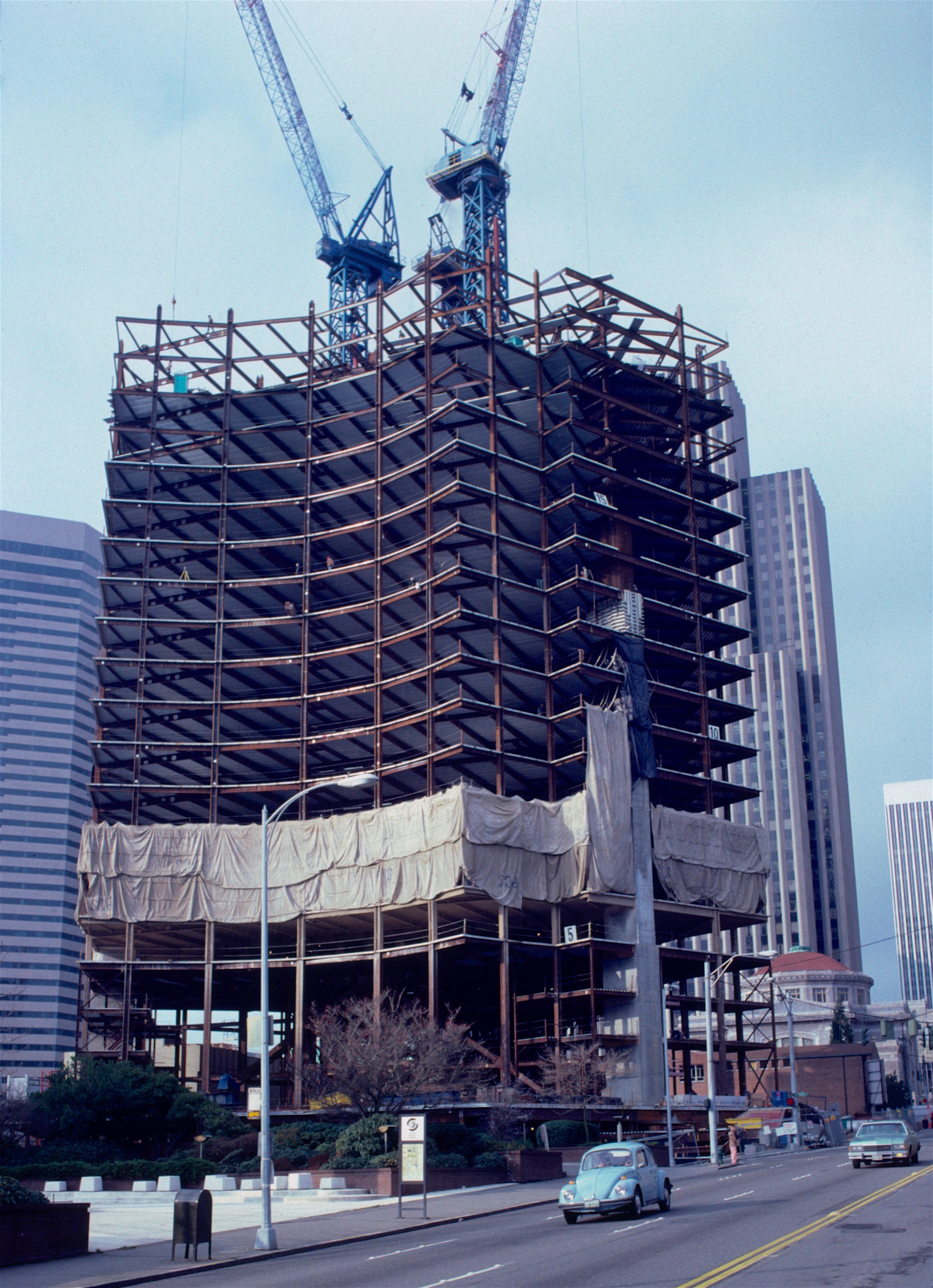
Under construction in late 1983

Martin Selig, a local real estate developer who had recently opened the Fourth and Blanchard Building, announced plans for a 75-story office building at 4th Avenue and Columbia Street in October 1980. The $120 million project, named the "Columbia Center", would be funded by the Seafirst Mortgage Company and constructed by Howard S. Wright. Selig borrowed $205 million in 1981 to develop the property. The Columbia Seafirst Center, as it came to be known, was constructed by Howard S. Wright starting in 1982 with a 120-foot (37 m) deep excavation hole that required 225,000 cubic yards (172,000 m^{3}) of dirt and soil to be removed. This was one of the largest foundations for a building in Seattle along with concrete footings extending 134 feet (41 m) below street level. While the structural steel of the building was built at a rate of 2 floors per week, the building itself was completed on January 12, 1985, and opened on March 2 of that same year. U.S. Steel Corporation was contracted to provide 16,000 short tons (15,000 t) of steel for construction. It was approximately 50% taller than the previous tallest skyscraper in Seattle, the 630-foot (190 m) Seattle First National Bank Building (now Safeco Plaza) that opened in 1969.

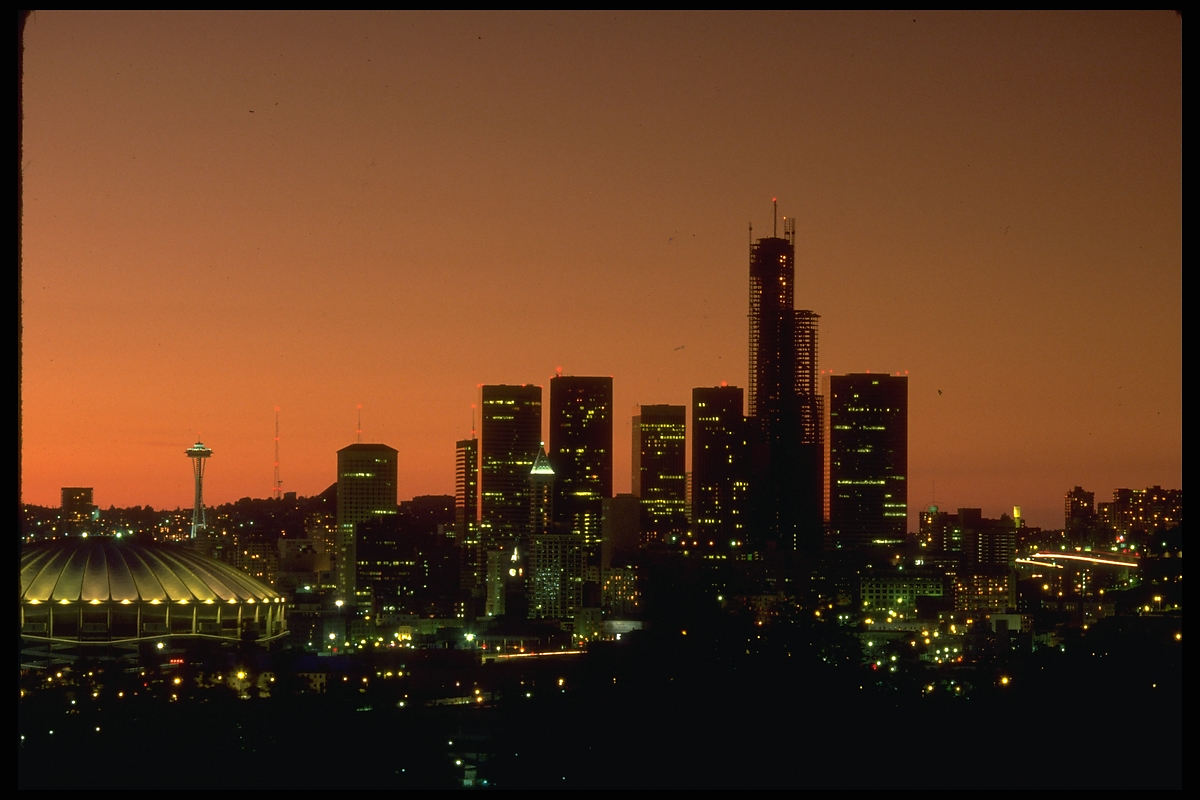
The Columbia Center (then Columbia Seafirst Center) under construction c. 1983

=== Financial issues and height controversy ===
Selig continued to own and manage the building until 1989 when financial problems forced him to sell it to Seafirst Corporation for $354 million. Management was taken over by the Tishman West Company of Los Angeles.

Controversy regarding the skyscraper's size contributed to the passage of a 1989 law called the Citizen's Alternative Plan (CAP) that enforced more stringent restrictions on the size of buildings in Downtown Seattle. In 1990, after rejecting earlier plans for 300-foot (91 m) antennas, Seattle and the FAA granted permission to erect two 192-foot (59 m) antennas on top of Columbia Center, which were expected to be used for broadcasting radio and television throughout the region. Though the FAA was originally worried about the tower's height encroaching the airspace, they deemed the addition of the antennas not problematic. The antennas were not built before the permits expired in 1994, however.

=== Ownership changes ===
EQ Office bought Columbia Center from Seafirst in 1998 for $404 million. The New York State Common Retirement Fund bought a 49.9% stake in the building and then several years later sold its share back to EQ Office. In 2007, Columbia Center was sold by EQ Office to Boston-based Beacon Capital Partners for $621 million; Beacon later defaulted on a loan in 2010, the height of the Great Recession, at a time when vacancies reached 40%. On August 7, 2015, Hong Kong-based Gaw Capital Partners purchased the building for $711 million.

=== Renovations ===
On July 1, 2013, the Columbia Center's observation deck, known as the Sky View, was remodeled from 270 degrees to a 360-degree viewing area. The observation deck underwent further renovations in 2018, adding two express elevators and a new lounge. The 4th Avenue lobby was also renovated to add a wide wooden staircase with seating areas.

=== September 11 attacks ===
The office tower was evacuated on the morning of 9/11, soon after the World Trade Center collapsed, and reopened on September 12th.

On June 16, 2004, the 9/11 Commission reported that the original plan for the September 11 attacks called for the hijacking of 10 planes, to be crashed into targets including the "tallest buildings in California and Washington state," which would have been the U.S. Bank Tower in Los Angeles and the Columbia Center, respectively.

== Events ==
Columbia Center plays host to the largest on-air firefighter competition in the world, the LLS Firefighter Stairclimb. About 2,000 firefighters from around the world yearly make the trek up 69 floors and 1,311 steps in full structural turnout gear while on air. This event benefits the Washington/Alaska chapter of the Leukemia and Lymphoma Society.

Big Climb is the sister event to the LLS Firefighter Stairclimb. About 6,000 participants race and climb to the top of Columbia Center, raising more than $3 million for the Leukemia and Lymphoma Society. This event is open to the public and anyone 8 years of age or older can participate.

== Gallery ==
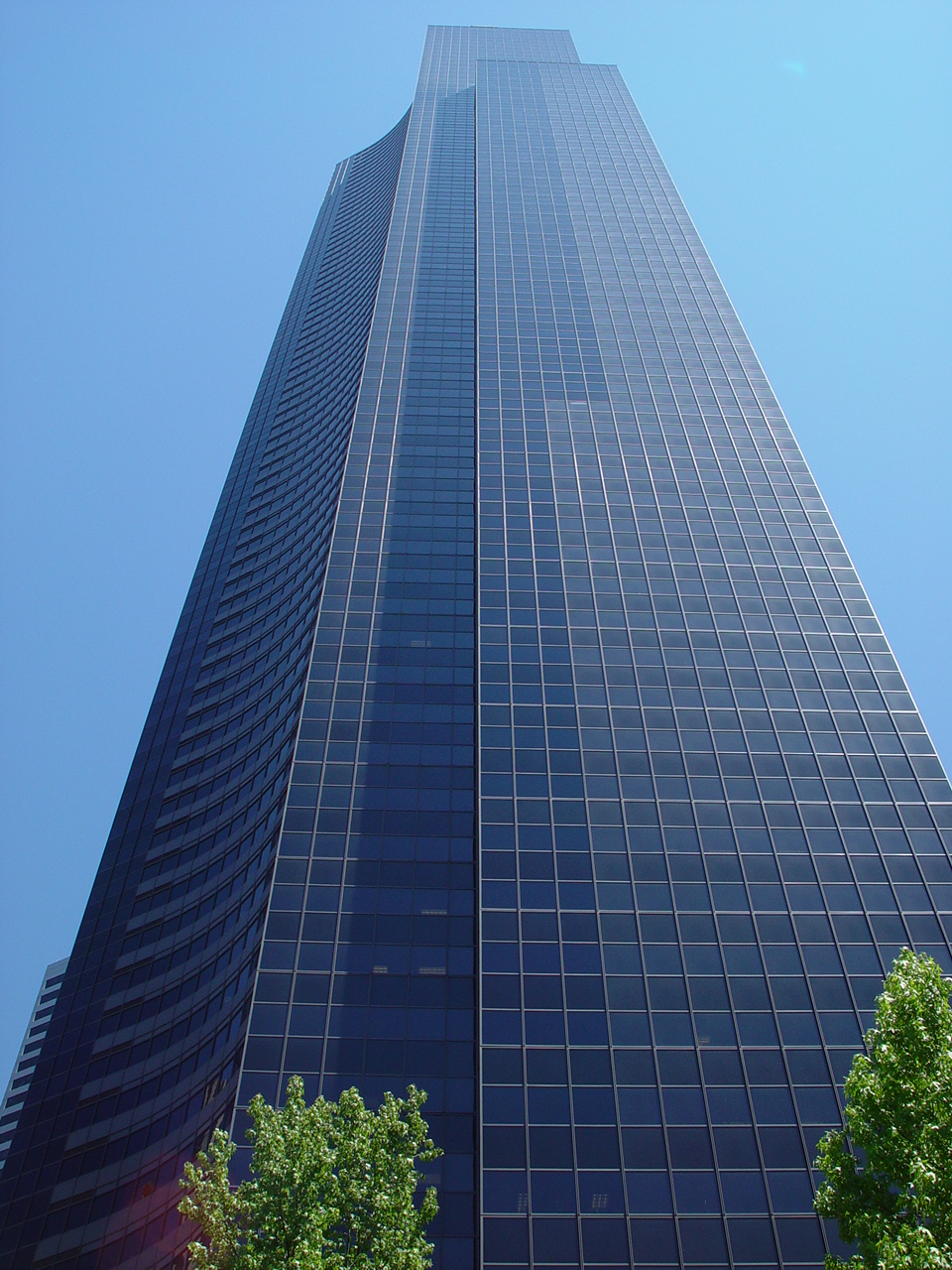
Columbia Center

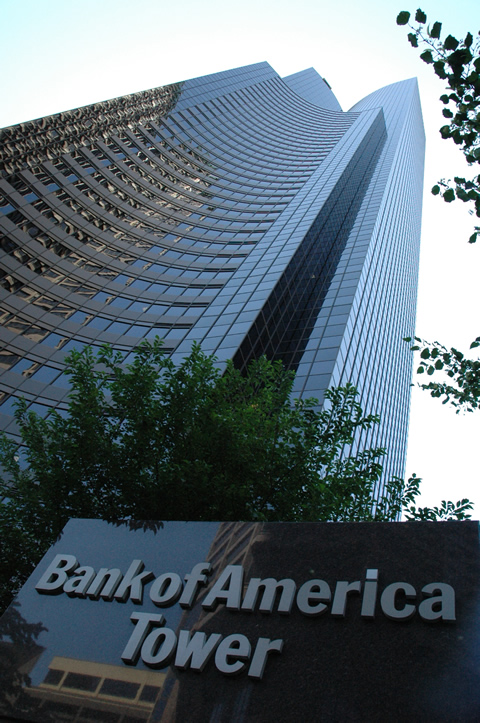
Columbia Center when it was called the Bank of America Tower

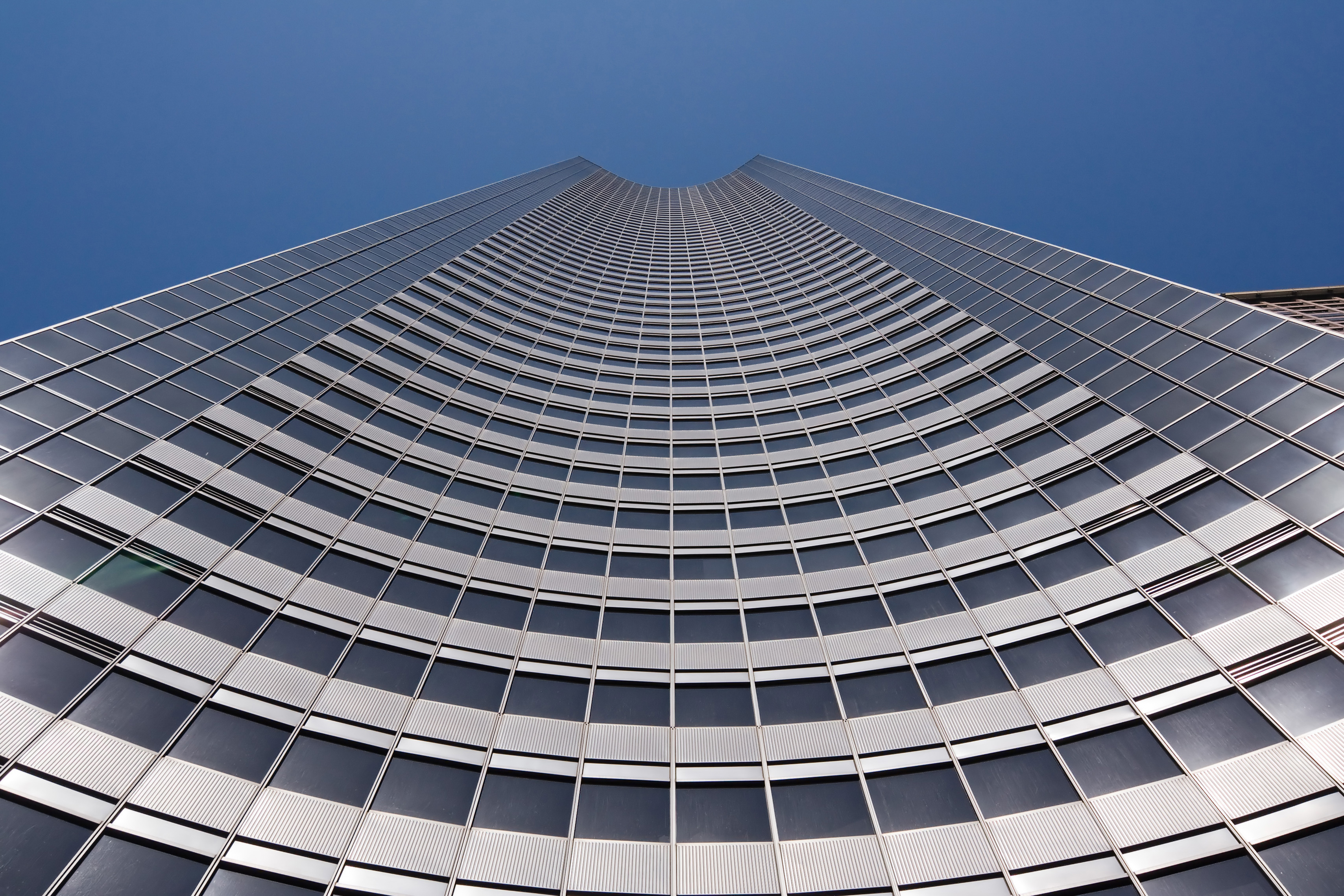
Columbia Center from below

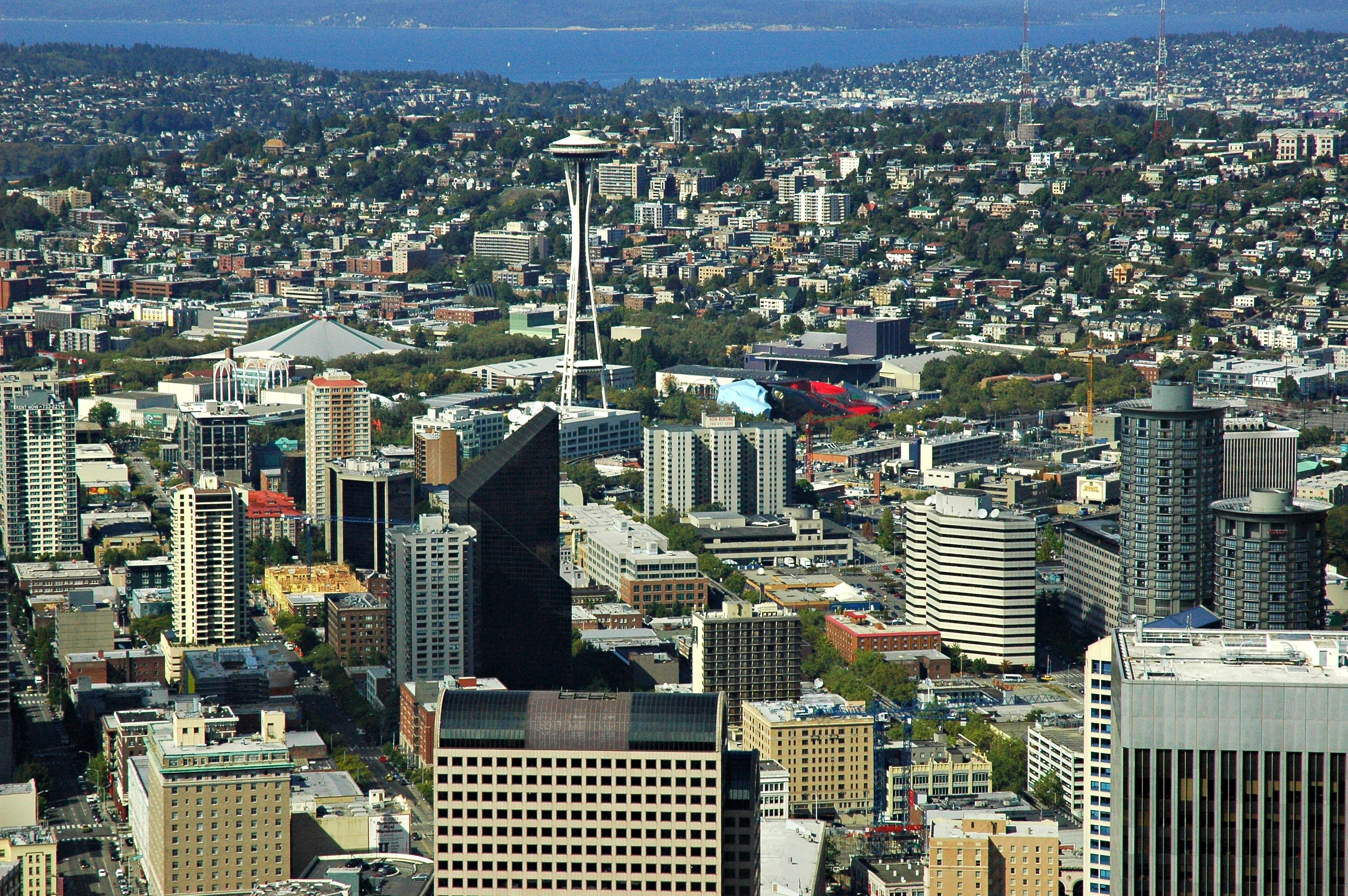
The Space Needle from the observation deck

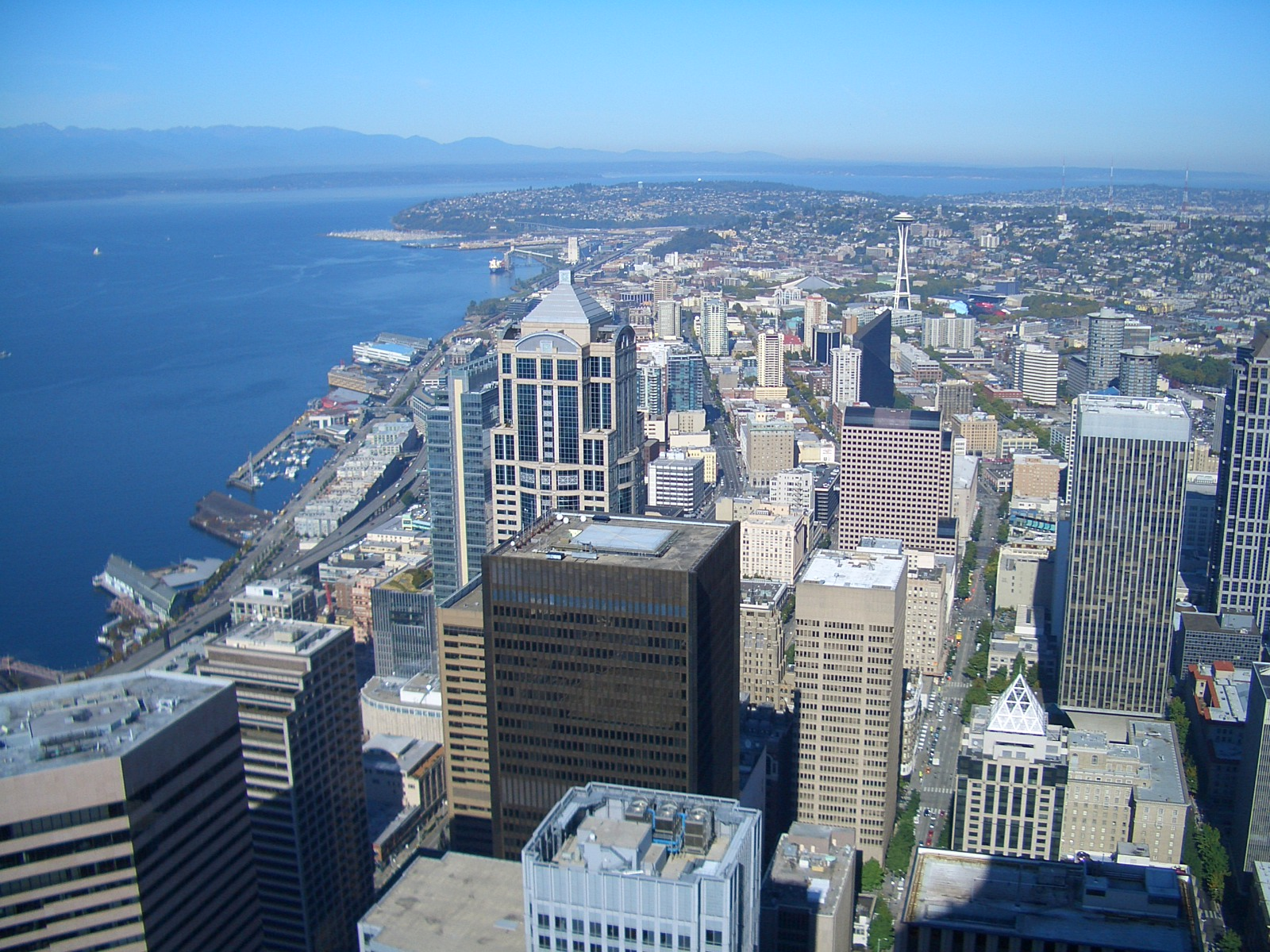
Downtown Seattle from the observation deck

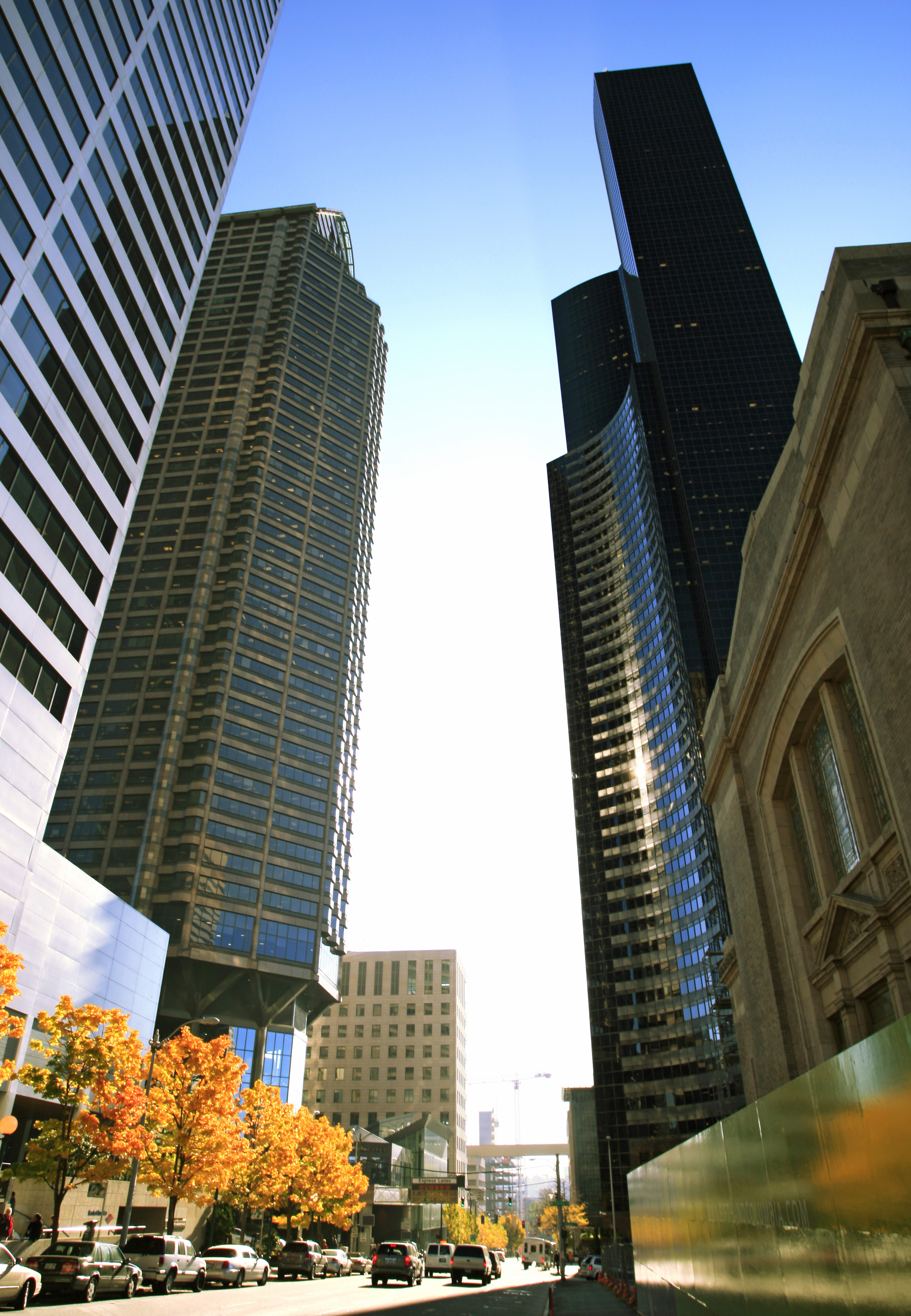
Beneath Columbia Center

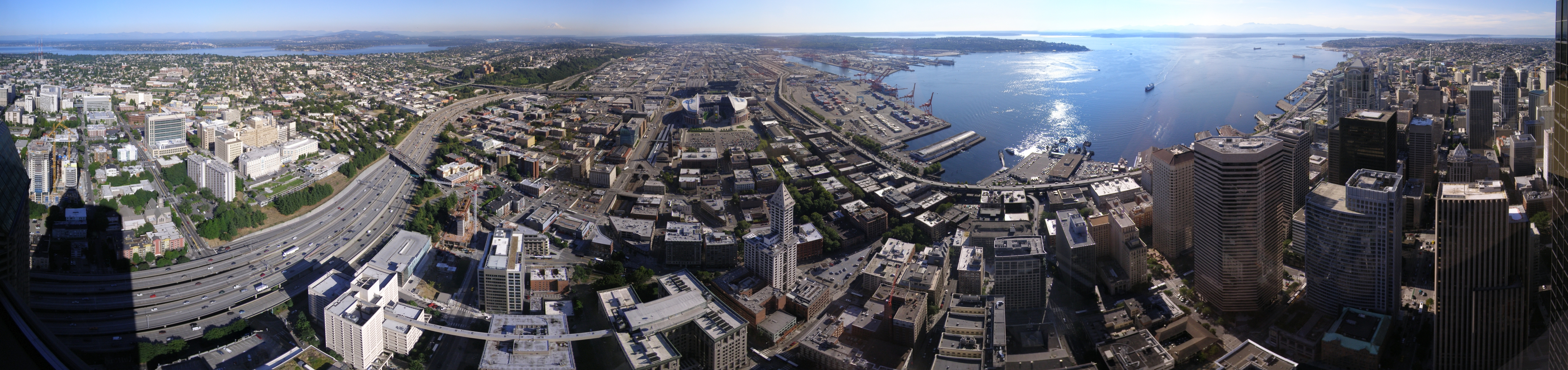
Panorama from the observation deck

Inside the observation deck in 2011, prior to renovations

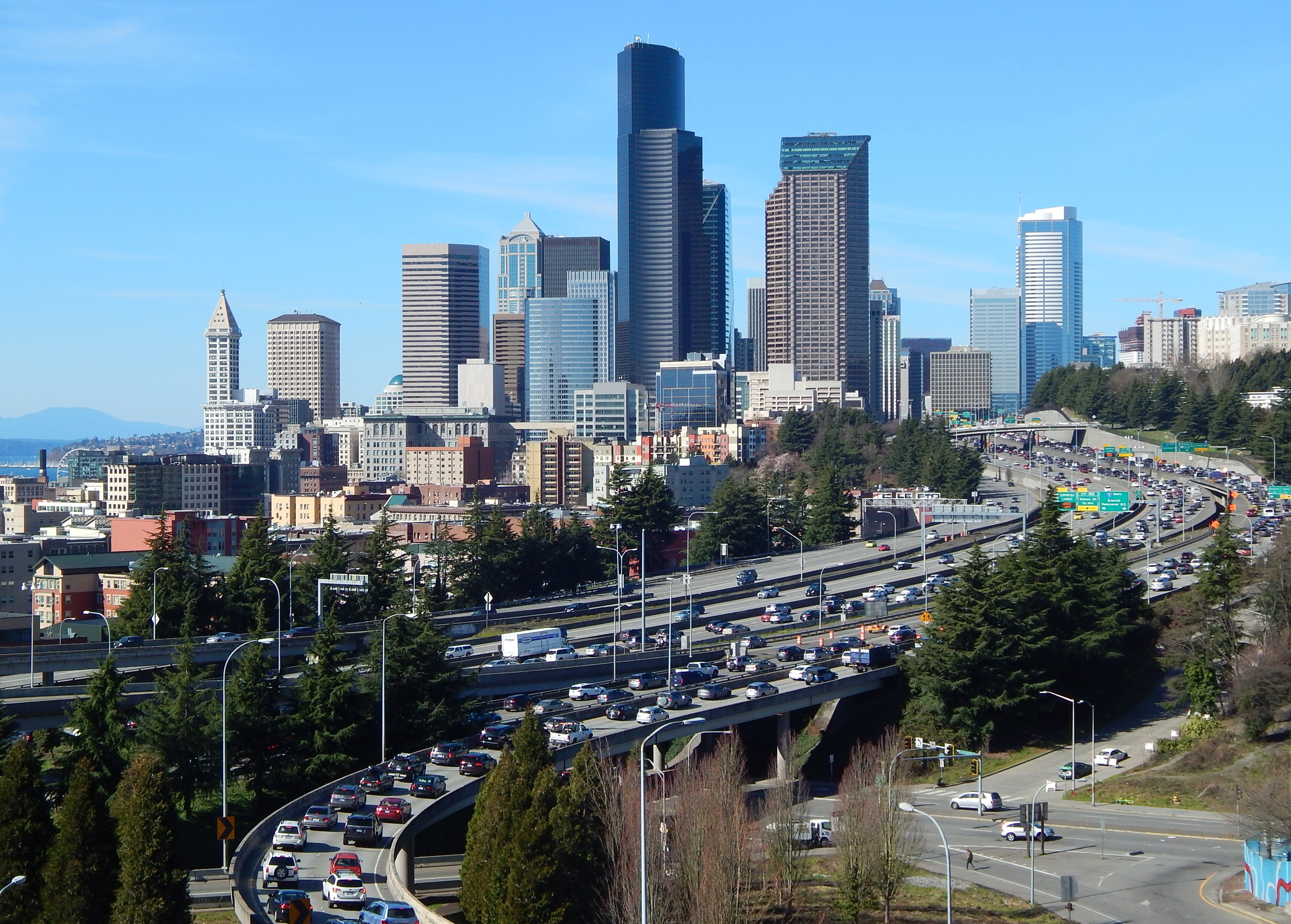
Columbia Center seen from Rizal Park

== See also ==
- List of tallest buildings in Seattle
- List of tallest buildings in the United States
- List of tallest buildings by U.S. state
