= Martin Selig =

Property developer

- Born: 1936 or 1937 (age 88–89); Germany
- Known for: Founder and owner of Martin Selig Real Estate
- Spouse(s): Andrea Selig (divorced); Catherine Mayer
- Children: 3

Martin Selig (born 1936/37) is a German-born American property developer, known for his work in Seattle including the Columbia Center, the city's tallest building. In 2019, his net worth was estimated at $2 billion. Between December 2024 and June 2025, most of Selig's Seattle properties were turned over to creditors or receivers, due to unpaid loans totaling over $850 million.

== Early life ==
Martin Selig was born to a Jewish family in Germany, the son of Manfred Selig (1902–1992), who was born in Buchen, Germany, the son of a horse trader. In 1939, Manfred was warned by a neighbor "that the Nazis had labeled him an undesirable". He, his wife, and two children left quickly. The next day, the Nazis confiscated his home and business. The family hid in warehouses in Frankfurt, before heading eastwards via Poland, Russia, Korea and Japan. They boarded a steamer to San Francisco, but chose Seattle "on a whim" because the boat stopped there and the sun was shining.

In Seattle, Manfred opened "Selig's Linen Shop", started a children's clothing business, and was an art collector.

== Career ==
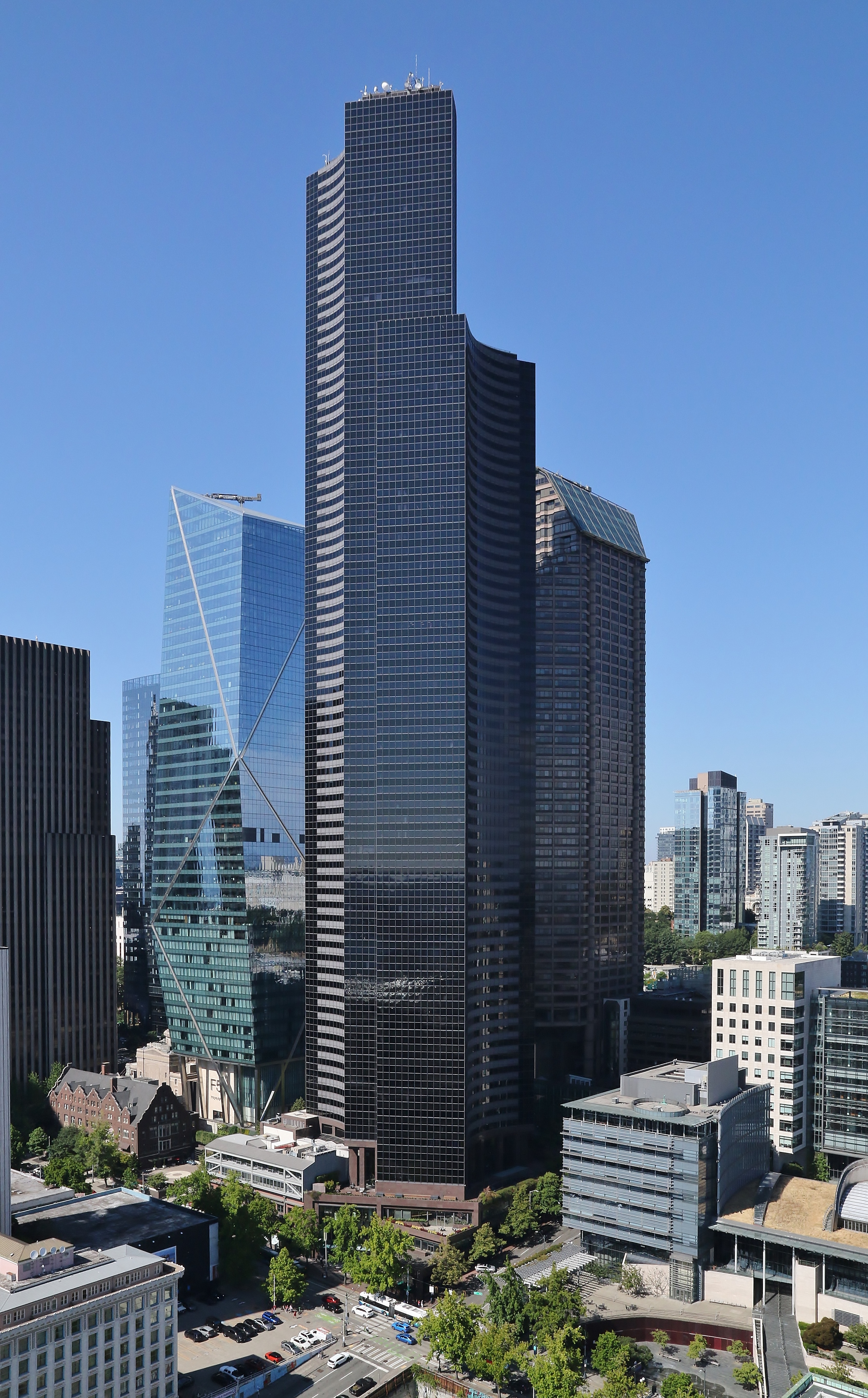
Columbia Center, Seattle

Selig worked for his father in his children's clothing store before building his first shopping center in 1962. His plan to build a 48-story building in Belltown in 1979 was cancelled after protests from residents of the existing Devonshire Apartments, a low-income housing property on the site.

Since then, he has built mostly tall buildings in Seattle, including two blocks on Fifth Avenue known as Fifth & Jackson and Fifth & Yesler, and by the 1980s owned nearly one-third of Seattle's office space, with Forbes estimating his 1987 net worth at US$270 million. He was the developer for the Columbia Center in 1985, still the city's tallest building, and sold it in 1989 for $354 million.

In August 2015, it was reported that he had submitted plans to build a 31-story tower on top of the 1950s Federal Reserve Bank Building on 2nd Avenue. He bought the building in a government auction for $16 million earlier in 2015. The two buildings would be separated by what he describes as a 36-foot (11 m) high "winter garden". The project was later scaled down to eight stories after historic preservation groups objected to the taller height; the renovated building opened in 2020, without a major tenant.

In October 2015, Martin Selig Real Estate owned 4,000,000 square feet (370,000 m^{2}) of office space in Seattle, and his estimated net worth was $1.1 billion. In 2019, Selig's net worth was reportedly $2 billion. The firm has been criticized for being delinquent on paying electricity bills to Seattle City Light in 2006 and 2016, the latter totaling $1.9 million before being paid. In 2025, the city of Seattle sued entities associated with Selig for over $4.5 million in unpaid assessments due to the Metropolitan Improvement District, a business improvement district, over an 11-year period.

=== 2020s defaults and receiverships ===
The COVID-19 pandemic's negative impact on Seattle's office space market led to major financial troubles for Martin Selig Real Estate. On March 20, 2024, a loan of $239 million, backed by seven of Selig's office buildings in downtown Seattle, was flagged for "imminent maturity default", suggesting that the borrowers were not expected to be able to repay the loan in full. The loan was transferred to a special servicer. As of April 20, 2024, Selig's businesses had at least $8 million in delinquent bills, including $3.4 million in delinquent property tax payments. Selig defaulted on another loan, of $240 million, according to documents filed on November 15, 2024. In December 2024, Martin Selig Real Estate told lenders that it would not be able to repay a different $379 million loan that would be due in April 2025, bringing the company's total delinquent or defaulted loans to over $800 million, associated with 18 office buildings.

Martin Selig Real Estate experienced continuing financial troubles in 2025. In February, seven of Selig's parking lots went into receivership, in response to a petition by Goldman Sachs Bank, which had lent Selig $50 million against the parking lots. One of the lots later sold to Urban Visions and Diamond Parking for less than one-third of what Selig had paid for it a decade earlier. On March 31, Martin Selig Real Estate laid off 86 employees, of a workforce estimated to be below 200 people, effective the following day. Jordan Selig, Martin's daughter and the heir apparent to the 87-year-old founder, resigned from Martin Selig Real Estate on April 8. In April, the company finalized a deal to hand over 400 Westlake and the Federal Reserve Building, two of its largely vacant office buildings, to its lender, Acore Capital. Selig lost the Modern in May 2025, and nine other buildings in June, due to his company’s inability to pay loans associated with them. In August 2025, seven of Selig's buildings, including the Fifth & Jackson building, were sold to CW Capital for $120 million; they had been backing $239 million in commercial mortgage-backed securities.

According to an order filed on April 10, 2026, Selig handed over three more properties to court-appointed receivers. A vacant single-story lab/office building at 401 Queen Anne Ave N, a neighboring three-story, 20-unit apartment building, and a two-story office building at 423 3rd Ave W were backing a $17.3 million loan by HomeStreet Bank, which had since become part of Mechanics Bank, who had filed a petition in February 2026 to have the court appoint a receiver.

Martin Selig Real Estate's chief financial officer, Benjamin Freeburg, left the firm to become CFO of Clise Properties in September 2026. As of September 9, 2026, MSRE's web site lists four employees, including Selig and not including Freeburg.

=== Projects ===
- Columbia Center (owned until 1989): tallest building in Seattle since completion
- 1000 Second Avenue: company headquarters (owned until 2025)
- Fifth & Yesler Building
- Fifth & Jackson Building (owned until 2025)
- 1015 Second Avenue, at the site of Federal Reserve Bank Building (owned until 2025)
- The Modern (the company's first residential tower, opened in 2020; owned until 2025)

== Personal life ==
Selig is a painter and an art collector, and owns works by Rembrandt and Toulouse-Lautrec.

He was married to Andrea Selig; they divorced in 1995. They have three children: David, Lauren and Jordan. Selig later married artist Catherine Mayer.

Lauren Selig, a film producer and corporate executive, is the widow of Russian-born American Kyril Faenov, head of Microsoft's High Performance Computing Lab, who died by suicide in 2012.

Jordan Selig, who was the presumptive heir of Martin Selig Real Estate, left her position as executive vice president of the firm in April 2025.

=== Political views ===
Selig is a Republican and donates to political causes. He endorsed and planned a fundraiser for Donald Trump in the 2016 presidential election, but later withdrew his support. He later contributed $50,000 to Donald Trump's 2020 presidential campaign.
