= John E. Freund =

American statistician (1921–2004)

John Ernst Freund
- Portrait of John E. Freund
- Born: August 6, 1921; Berlin, Germany
- Died: August 14, 2004 (aged 83); Paradise Valley, Arizona, USA
- Occupation(s): Author of statistics textbooks, mathematics professor
- Years active: 1952–2004
- Spouse: Maxine Freund née Henville

John Ernst Freund (August 6, 1921 – August 14, 2004) was a prominent author of university level textbooks on statistics and a mathematics professor at Arizona State University. Born in Berlin, Germany, he emigrated to Mandatory Palestine in the 1930s. He studied at the University of London and at the University of California at Los Angeles, from which he received his bachelor's degree. He did graduate work at Columbia University and the University of Pittsburgh, from which he received his doctorate in 1952.

In 1960 he was elected as a Fellow of the American Statistical Association.

== Selected publications ==
- Freund, John E. (1952). Some Methods of Estimating Prior Probabilities from Heterogeneous Populations (Thesis). University of Pittsburgh.
- Freund, John E. (1962). Mathematical statistics. Englewood Cliffs, N.J.: Prentice-Hall. OCLC 859809293.
- Miller, Irwin; Miller, Marylees; Freund, John E. (2014). John E. Freund's Mathematical Statistics with Applications (Eighth ed.). Upper Saddle River, N.J.: Pearson Education. ISBN 9780134995373. OCLC 1020297405.
- Freund, J. E.; Simon, G. A. (1992). Modern elementary statistics (8 ed.). Englewood Cliffs, New Jersey: Prentice-Hall. ISBN 9780136026990. OCLC 24173724.
