= Sina Robotic Surgical System =

Robotic surgical system

- Manufacturer: Sina Robotics and Medical Innovators Co.
- Country: Iran
- Type: Medical
- Purpose: Medical
- Website: https://sinamed.ir

The Sina Robotic Surgical System is a robotic surgical system that uses a minimally invasive surgical approach. The system is manufactured by the company Sina Robotics and Medical Innovators. The system is used for prostatectomies, and increasingly for cardiac valve repair, and for renal and gynecologic surgical procedures.

In May 2023, two devices of this system have been exported to Indonesia. Russian institutions have also expressed interest in the device. In this context, a joint production agreement of this system has been signed with the Russian Central Research and Development Institute of Robotics and Cybernetic Technologies. According to this agreement, the Sina surgeon robot is supposed to be produced in Iran in semi-assembled form and exported to Russia as SKD and assembled in Saint Petersburg.

== See also ==
- ZEUS, a robotic surgical system (discontinued in 2003).
