= Michael Stifelman =

American physician and urologist

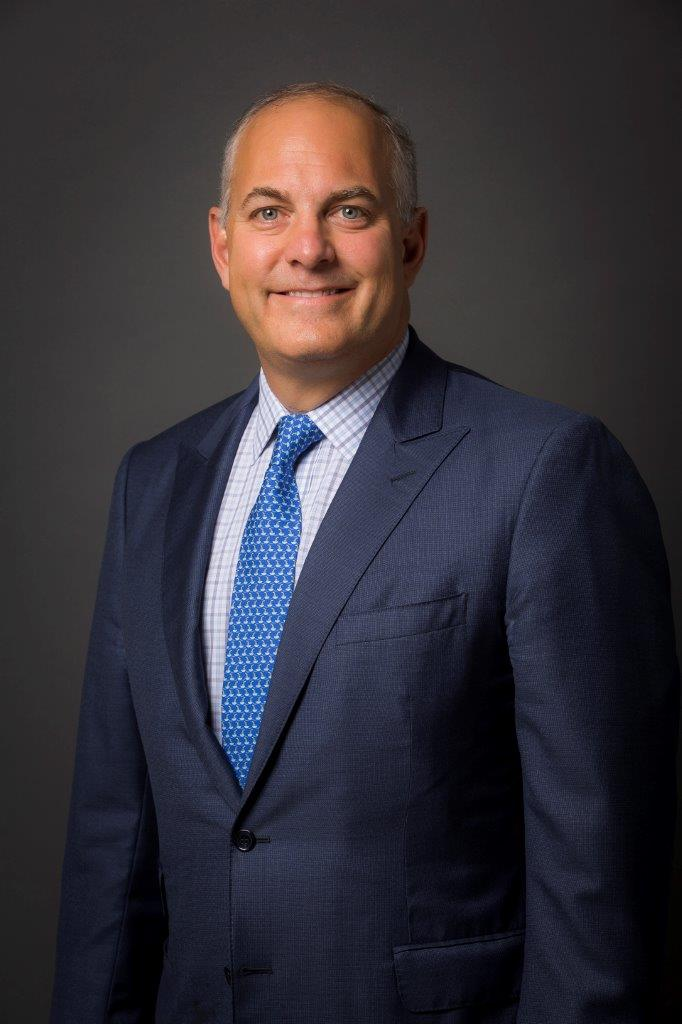
Dr. Michael Stifelman in 2017

Michael D. Stifelman (born May 7, 1967) is an American urologist. He is known for his introducing surgical techniques in urology, including developments in robotic partial nephrectomy, the use of near-infrared fluorescence imaging in renal surgery.

He is a Chair of Urology at Hackensack University Medical Center, Director of Robotic Surgery at Hackensack Meridian Health, and Professor and Inaugural Chair of Urology at Hackensack Meridian School of Medicine.

== Biography ==
Stifelman earned his undergraduate degree in zoology from the University of Massachusetts and his medical degree from the Albert Einstein College of Medicine in the Bronx, NY.

Stifelman joined HackensackUMC in 2016 after working at NYU Langone Medical Center, where he was Professor of Urology at the NYU School of Medicine, Director of the Robotic Surgery Center, and Chief of Urology Services at Tisch Hospital.

He completed his internship and residency in general surgery, as well as his urology residency at Columbia Presbyterian Medical Center, NY, serving as chief resident in urology during his final year. He received his fellowship in endourology and laparoscopy at Weill Cornell Medical Center, New York, NY, and is board certified in urology.

Stifelman currently serves as Professor and Inaugural Chair of Urology, Hackensack Meridian School of Medicine; Chair of Urology, Hackensack Meridian Hackensack University Medical Center; Director of Urologic Oncology at John Theurer Cancer Center; and Director of Robotic Surgery, Hackensack Meridian Health.

From 2009 to 2012, he was a co-investigator in a Vivus-sponsored study on Avanafil for erectile dysfunction after prostatectomy, and in the NIH/Gen-Probe-sponsored EDRN PCA3 Validation Trial. In 2015, he was a co-investigator in the ADAPT Phase 3 trial on dendritic cell immunotherapy for advanced renal cell carcinoma. Since 2016, he has been the principal investigator in the TARPAN Study on the use of the AirSeal system in robotic partial nephrectomy. He is also the principal investigator of a study on prostasomes as a diagnostic tool for prostate cancer, ongoing since 2018.

Stifelman’s current translational research interests include prostasomes for prostate cancer detection, creating a biorepository of urologic cancers, and amniotic membrane nerve regeneration.

== Research ==
=== CLARIX Clinical Trial ===
Stifelman serves as the principal investigator of a prospective, randomized controlled clinical trial at Hackensack University Medical Center evaluating the efficacy of CLARIX® CORD 1K, a cryopreserved umbilical cord allograft, in enhancing functional recovery following bilateral nerve-sparing robot-assisted radical prostatectomy (RARP). The trial, titled Prospective, Controlled Study Evaluating Recovery of Potency and Continence Following Robot-Assisted Radical Prostatectomy with and without Cryopreserved Umbilical Cord Allograft, enrolls 100 male participants randomized in a 1:1 ratio to undergo either standard RARP or RARP with intraoperative CLARIX application.

The trial builds upon retrospective findings presented by Stifelman's colleague Ravi Munver at the 2018 World Congress of Endourology, which suggested that CLARIX may support earlier functional recovery post-surgery.

=== Herpes Simplex Virus (HSV) Gene Therapy Research ===
In addition to his work in robotic surgery, Stifelman collaborates on translational research involving the use of herpes simplex virus (HSV) as a vector for gene therapy. This line of investigation focuses on developing targeted drug delivery systems to treat chronic urologic conditions, such as neurogenic detrusor overactivity and other lower urinary tract dysfunctions.

== Honors and awards ==
- 1989 – Cum Laude University of Massachusetts
- 1989 – Louis Berman Research Scholarship
- 1993 – Alfred A. Angrist Prize for Excellence in Pathology Research
- 1997 – Columbia Presbyterian Medical Center House Staff Affairs Award
- 2000 – US Surgical New York Presbyterian Laparoscopic Fellow
- 2011 – Intuitive Crystal Award
- 2019 – Best Poster Award, World Congress of Endourology Annual Meeting (Abu Dhabi, UAE) “Operative and functional outcomes for selective clamping in robotic partial nephrectomy for patients with a solitary kidney.”
- Advisory Board, Health Concepts Partners, Saratoga, New York
- Scientific Advisory Board, Surgiquest, New Haven, CT
- Advisory Board, Vascular Technology Inc
- Scientific Board, Institute of Surgical Excellence
- Board Member, Hackensack Meridian Health System
- Scientific Advisory Board, CONMED Corporation

== Selected works and publications ==
- Lee M, Lee Z, Strauss D, Jun MS, Koster H, Asghar AM, Lee R, Chao B, Cheng N, Ahmed M, Lovallo G, Munver R, Zhao LC, Stifelman MD, Eun DD. Multi-Institutional Experience Comparing Outcomes of Adult Patients Undergoing Secondary Versus Primary Robotic Pyeloplasty. Urology. 2020 Jul 17:S0090-4295(20)30850-5. doi: 10.1016/j.urology.2020.07.008. [PMID 32687842]
- Badani KK, Kothari PD, Okhawere KE, Eun D. Hemal A, Abaza R, Porter J, Lovallo G, Ahmed M, Munver R, Stifelman MD. Selective clamping during robot-assisted partial nephrectomy in patients with a solitary kidney: Is it safe and does it help? BJU Int., Mar 2020; 10.111/bju.15043; (Epub ahead of print).
- Billah MS, Stifelman M, Lovallo G, Ahmed M, Tsui JF, He W, Munver R. Single port robotic assisted reconstructive urologic surgery – with the da Vinci SP surgical system. Trans Androl Urol. 2020 Apr 9;(2):870-878. doi: 10.21037/tau-2020.01.06. [PMID 32420202]
- Jun MS, Stair S, Xu A, Lee Z, Asghar AM, Strauss D, Stifelman MD, Eun DD, Zhao LC. Collaborative of Reconstructive Robotic Ureteral Surgery (CORRUS). Urology. 2020 Jul 15:S0090-4295(20)30829-3. doi: 10.1016/j.urology.2020.06.062. Online ahead of print. [PMID 32681918]
- Beksac AT, Okhawere KE, Meilika K, Ige OA, Lee JY, Lovallo G, Ahmed M, Stifelman MD, Eun DD, Abaza R, Badani KK. Should a drain be routinely required after transperitoneal robotic partial nephrectomy? J Endourol. 2020 Jun 27. doi: 10.1089/end.2020.0325. Online ahead of print. [PMID 32597218]
- White C, Stifelman MD. Ureteral Reimplantation, Psoas Hitch, and Boari Flap. J Endourol. 2020 May; 34(S1):S25-S30. doi: 10.1089/end.2018.0750. [PMID 32459151]
- Beksac AT, Okhawere KE, Rosen DC, Elbakry A, Dayal BD, Daza J, Sfakianos JP, Ronney A, Eun DD, Bhandari A, Hemal AK, Porter J, Stifelman MD, Badani KK. Do patients with Stage 3-5 chronic kidney disease benefit from ischaemia-sparing techniques during partial nephrectomy? BJU Int. 2020 Mar;125(3):442-448. doi: 10.1111/bju.14956. Epub 2019 Dec 26. [PMID 31758657]
- Zhao LC, Weinberg AC, Lee Z, Ferretti MJ, Koo HP, Metro MJ, Eun DD, Stifelman MD. Robot assisted ureteral reconstruction using buccal mucosa grafts; A multi-institutional experience. Eur Urol, Nov 2017; (Epub ahead of print).
- Marien T, Bjurlin MA, Wynia B, Bilbily M, Rao G, Zhao LC, Shah O, Stifelman MD. Outcomes of robotic-assisted laparoscopic upper urinary tract reconstruction: 250 consecutive patients. BJU Int. Oct 2015; 116(4):604-11.
- Bjurlin MA, Gan M, McClintock TR, Volpe A, Borofsky MS, Mottrie A, Stifelman MD. Near-infrared fluorescence imaging: Emerging applications in robotic upper urinary tract surgery. Eur Urol. Apr 2014; 65(4):793-801.
- Borofsky M, Stifelman MD. Near-infrared fluorescence imaging in robotic partial nephrectomy. In Robotic Renal Surgery: Benign and Cancer Surgery for the Kidneys and Ureters (pp. 89-96). Springer US, 2013.
- Hyams ES, Stifelman MD. Robotic Ureteral Reconstruction. Essentials Robotic Surgery. Li Ming Su (Ed), Elsevier. 203-240, New York 2011.
- Benway BM, Bhayani SB, Rogers CG, Dulabon LM, Patel MN, Lipkin M, Wang AJ, Stifelman MD. Robot assisted partial nephrectomy versus laparoscopic partial nephrectomy for renal tumors: a multi-institutional analysis of perioperative outcomes. J Urol. Sep 2009; 182(3):866-72.
