= Howard S. Wright Companies =

American construction services company

Coordinates: 47.62347°N 122.329299°W

The Howard S. Wright Companies were an American group of construction companies that provided pre-construction services, construction, construction management, and design-build services for a wide range of project types and industries, primarily within the ten western states of the United States. In 2008, the group was listed in the Top 100 Contractors by Engineering News-Record Magazine (ENR). The group was employee-owned and privately held until 2011, when it was acquired by Balfour Beatty.

== History ==
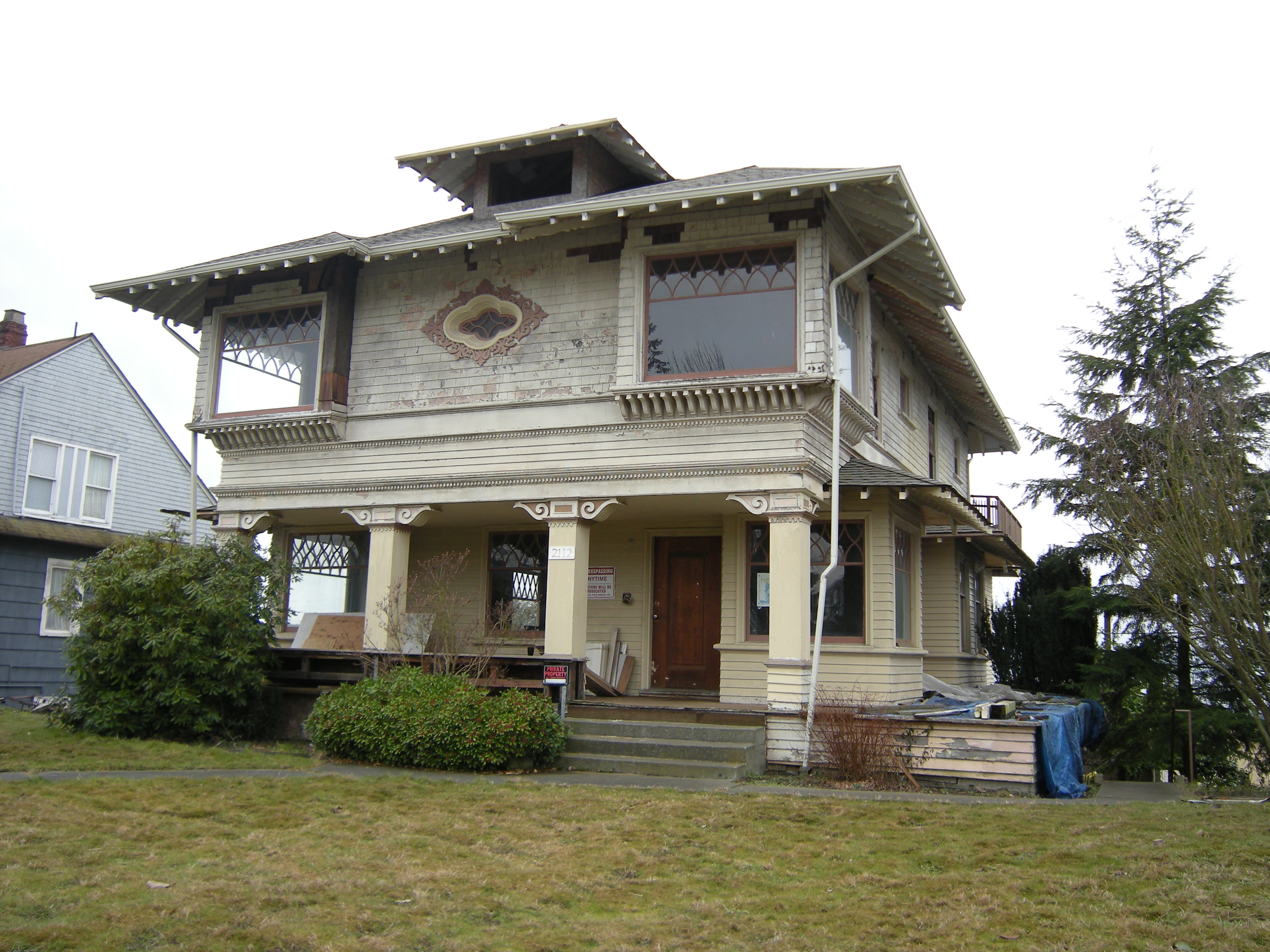
The Howard Wright House in Everett

Howard S. Wright was a cabinetmaker who founded Howard S. Wright Construction Co., in Port Townsend, Washington in 1885. The company moved to Everett in 1893 and to Seattle in 1929.

In the early 1960s, Howard S. Wright (HSW) was selected as the primary builder for the Century 21 Exposition in Seattle. It was for this event that the company built the Space Needle. Medical, hospitality, higher education, residential and commercial construction characterized the HSW’s work during the 1970s as the company extended its operations throughout the western United States. High-rise, office building, and hospitality construction dominated the company’s work in the 1980s.

In 2011, Howard S. Wright was acquired by Balfour Beatty.
