= John Freund (business executive) =

American business executive and satirist (born 1954)

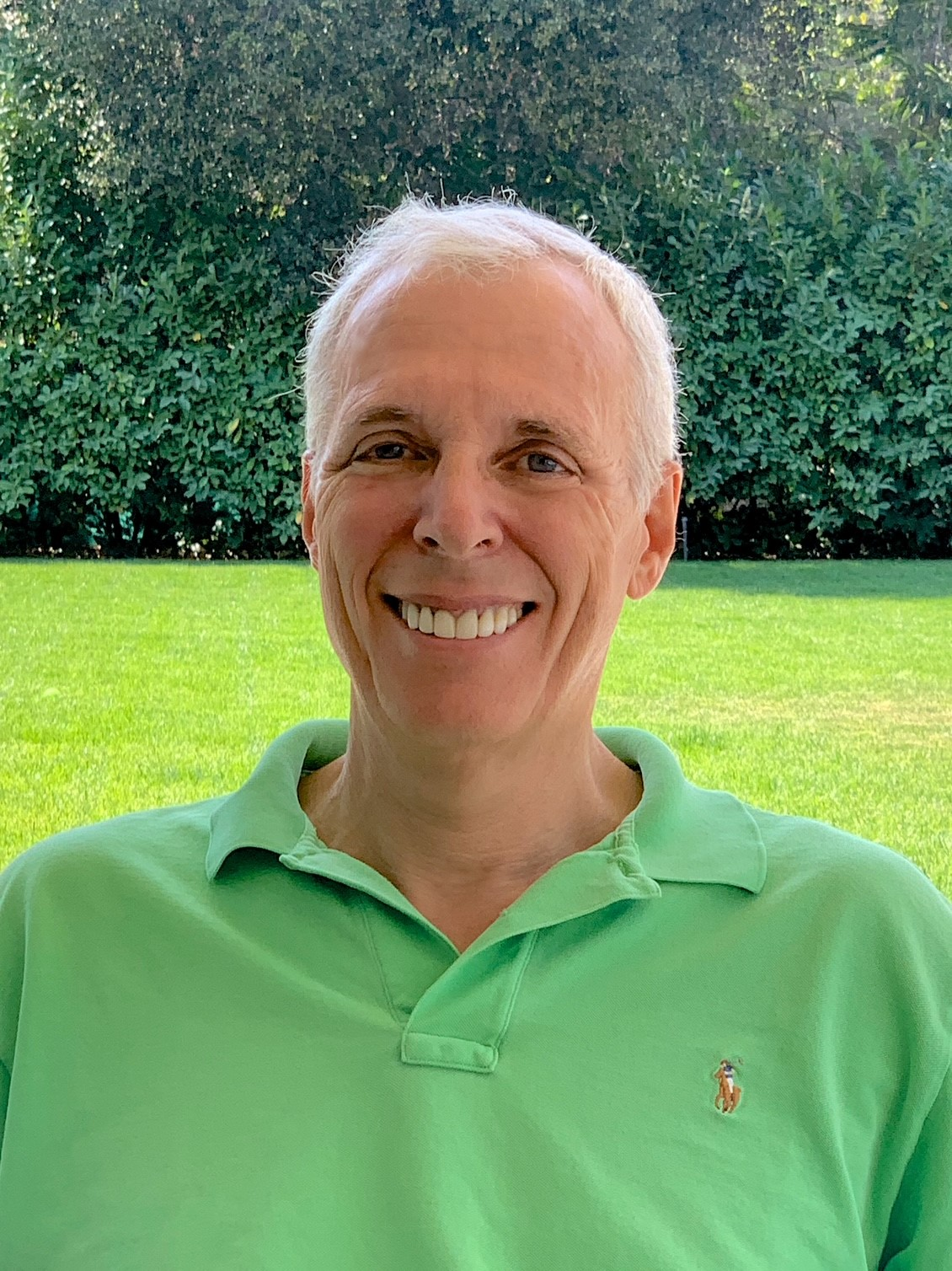
- Education: Harvard University
- Occupations: Founder and CEO of Skyline Ventures
- Website: www.skylineventures.com/team/john_freund.asp

John Freund is an American satirist and business executive. Freund and collaborator David Porter created the 1981 satirical poster Bedtime for Brezhnev and co-authored the 1982 satirical book The Official MBA Handbook or How to Succeed in Business Without a Harvard MBA, which spent 16 weeks on the New York Times bestseller list. Freund is the co-founder of Intuitive Surgical, and the co-founder and former CEO of Arixa Pharmaceuticals. He founded Skyline Ventures in 1997.

== Early life and education ==
Freund grew up in New York City. He graduated in 1975 with a B.A. from Harvard where he was an editor of the Harvard Crimson. After completing his B.A., Freund received an M.D. from Harvard Medical School. He received an MBA from Harvard Business School in 1982.

== Career ==
=== Early career ===
In April 1981, while enrolled in Harvard Business School, Freund collaborated with classmate David Porter on a satirical poster for an imaginary movie called Bedtime for Brezhnev, featuring then-president Ronald Reagan. The poster sold 275,000 copies, and sales of Bedtime for Brezhnev earned them enough money to pay their second year tuition. In the 2021 book Cowboy Presidents, it was reported that Reagan was rumored to have loved the poster. The original art for the Bedtime for Brezhnev is in the permanent collection of the National Museum of American History at the Smithsonian.

In 1982, Freund and David Porter co-authored the book The Official MBA Handbook or How to Succeed in Business Without a Harvard MBA, which they published under the pen names Jim Fisk and Robert Barron, respectively. The idea for the book first emerged when Freund and Porter approached the publisher Simon & Schuster to distribute Bedtime for Brezhnev, but the head of trade paperbacks instead suggested the pair write a satirical book about MBA's. At the time of the book's release, both men were preparing to start jobs with investment banks. The Official MBA Handbook or How to Succeed in Business Without a Harvard MBA spent 16 weeks on the New York Times bestseller list.

=== Medical startups ===
Freund began his business career as an investment banker in 1982 with Morgan Stanley. In 1995, he co-founded the robotics startup Intuitive Surgical. Freund negotiated a licensing agreement with SRI for surgical technology that formed the nucleus of Intuitive Surgical's line of products. Freund founded the venture capital firm Skyline Ventures in 1997 to invest in early-stage biotech. Skyline was the lead investor in SI-Bone, a manufacturer of sacroiliac fusion implants that became commercially available in 2009. Following the investment, Freund joined the board of directors. In 2016, Freund co-founded the antibiotics manufacturer Arixa Pharmaceuticals and served as the company's CEO. During Freund's tenure, the company developed ARX-1796, an oral version of a β-lactamase inhibitor called avibactam that was previously only able to be administered intravenously. Freund ran Arixa Pharmaceuticals as a virtual company, crediting low-overhead costs in the development of ARX-1796. Arixa Pharmaceuticals was acquired by Pfizer in 2020.

== Personal life ==
In 1979, Freund married Linda Gray Sexton, a writer and the daughter of the Pulitzer Prize winning poet Anne Sexton. They divorced in 1998. Freund is married to Linda S. Grais, a physician and biotech entrepreneur.
