= Vipul Patel =

American medical journalist

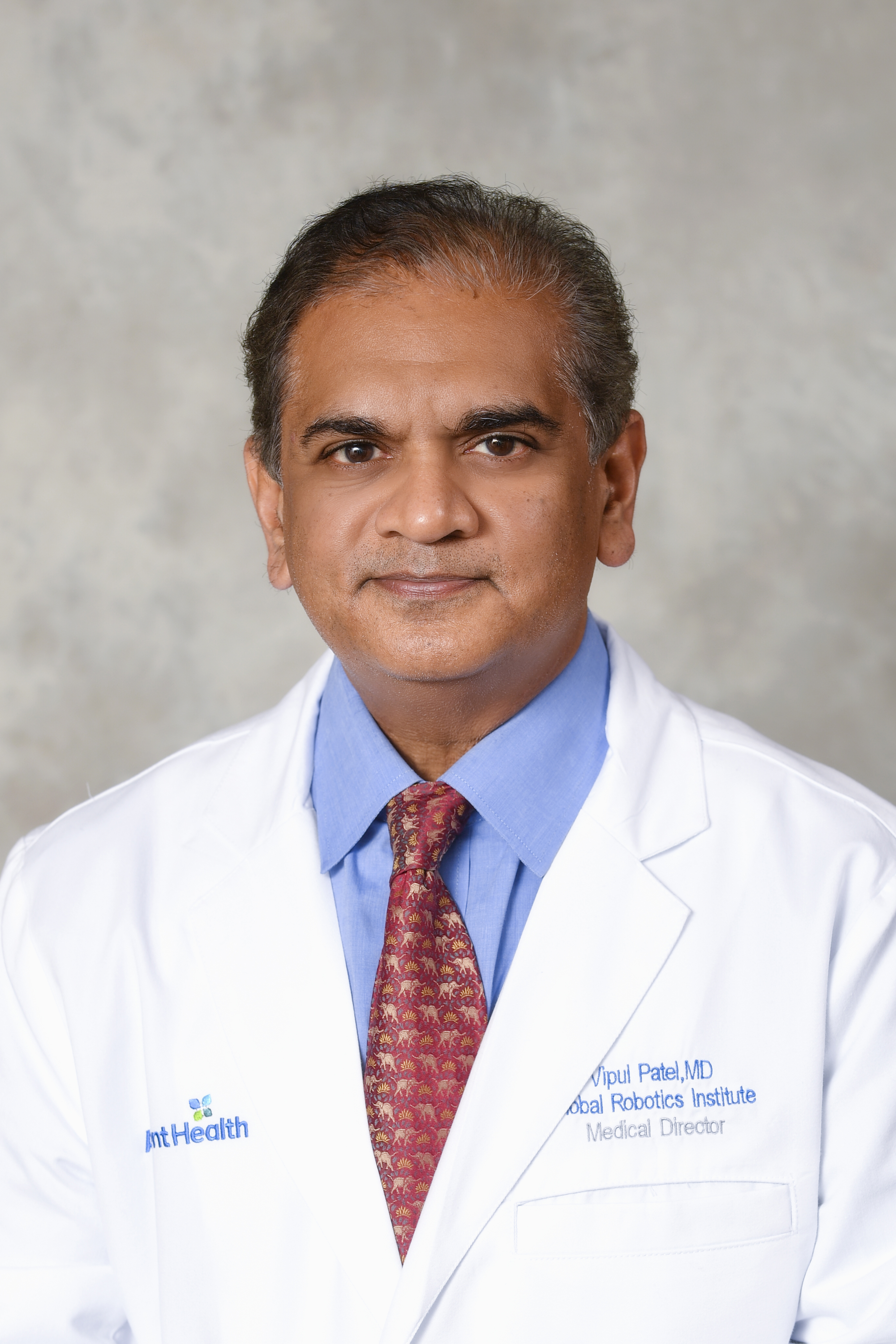

Vipul R. Patel is an American medical journalist who is the founder and Medical Director of the AdventHealth’s Global Robotics Institute, founder and Vice President of the Society of Robotic Surgery, and founder and Editor Emeritus of The Journal of Robotic Surgery. He is board certified by the American Urological Association and specializes in robotic surgery for prostate cancer. On April 29, 2024, Dr. Vipul Patel completed his 18,000th robotic-assisted prostatectomy. The large volume of prostatectomies he has performed has enabled him to amass a large amount of statistical evidence regarding the efficacy of robotic techniques which has been used in developing and refining techniques. Patel credits the use of robotic assisted surgery with helping surgeons achieve better surgical outcomes with the "trifecta" of cancer control, continence and sexual function. In the course of his career Patel has led and participated in studies that have resulted in developing improved outcomes for robotic surgery and urologic treatment.

== Biography ==
In January, 2008 Patel left Ohio and moved to Florida where he became Medical Director of the Global Robotics Institute at AdventHealth Celebration and Director of Urologic Oncology at the AdventHealth Cancer Institute.

In 2012 Patel founded the International Prostate Cancer Foundation, a charitable institution with the goals of promoting research in testing for genetic predisposition to prostate cancer, patient and physician education, and global screening for early detection of prostate cancer. Patel serves as chairman of the foundation.

== Academic career ==
Patel has played a major role in training and mentoring students in robotic technologies and in establishing robotic surgery programs in many countries. He was instrumental in developing guidelines for training and credentialing the next generation of robotic surgeons.

He leads the robotic training team at the Nicholson Center, is a Professor of Urology at the University of Central Florida, and a Clinical Associate Professor of Urology at Nova Southeastern University.

He wrote the first textbook on robotic urologic surgery, now in a second edition.

He has helped to establish and train robotic surgery units around the world. For example, in 2004 he established a robotic surgery department at the Hospital Kuala Lumpur in Malaysia. In 2008 he trained the first Russian robotic surgery team and performed the first robotic prostatectomy in Russia, for which he was inducted into the Russian Academy of Sciences.

On June 17, 2025, Good Morning America announced that he had performed the first prostatectomy via transcontinental telesurgery on a man in Angola. On October 26, 2026, the news show announced that he had performed the first telesurgery between two United States hospitals, AdventHealth Celebration and AdventHealth Minneola.

== Works ==
=== Textbooks as editor ===
- Patel, Vipul. (2015). Robotic Urologic Surgery. (2nd ed- Chinese Translation). Beijing, China: World Publishing Xi'an Corporation Ltd.
- Patel, Vipul. (2012). Robotic Urologic Surgery. (2nd ed.). London, England: Springer.
- Patel, V., Ramalingam, M. (2009) Operative Atlas of Laparoscopic Reconstructive Urology. London, England: Springer.
- Patel, Vipul. (2007). Robotic Urologic Surgery. London, England: Springer.

=== Articles ===
Patel has published more than one hundred articles in scientific and medical journals. The most cited include:

- Ficarra, Vincenzo; Novara, Giacomo; Artibani, Walter; Cestari, Andrea; Galfano, Antonio; Graefen, Markus; Guazzoni, Giorgio; Guillonneau, Bertrand; Menon, Mani; Montorsi, Francesco; Patel, Vipul; Rassweiler, Jens; Van Poppel, Hendrik (2009). "Retropubic, Laparoscopic, and Robot-Assisted Radical Prostatectomy: A Systematic Review and Cumulative Analysis of Comparative Studies". European Urology. 55 (5): 1037–63. doi:10.1016/j.eururo.2009.01.036. PMID 19185977.
- Patel, V; Tully, A; Holmes, R; Lindsay, J (2005). "Robotic Radical Prostatectomy in the Community Setting—The Learning Curve and Beyond: Initial 200 Cases". The Journal of Urology. 174 (1): 269–72. doi:10.1097/01.ju.0000162082.12962.40. PMID 15947662.
- Ficarra, Vincenzo; Novara, Giacomo; Rosen, Raymond C.; Artibani, Walter; Carroll, Peter R.; Costello, Anthony; Menon, Mani; Montorsi, Francesco; Patel, Vipul R.; Stolzenburg, Jens-Uwe; Van Der Poel, Henk; Wilson, Timothy G.; Zattoni, Filiberto; Mottrie, Alexandre (2012). "Systematic Review and Meta-analysis of Studies Reporting Urinary Continence Recovery After Robot-assisted Radical Prostatectomy". European Urology. 62 (3): 405–17. doi:10.1016/j.eururo.2012.05.045. PMID 22749852.
- Coelho, Rafael F.; Rocco, Bernardo; Patel, Manoj B.; Orvieto, Marcelo A.; Chauhan, Sanket; Ficarra, Vincenzo; Melegari, Sara; Palmer, Kenneth J.; Patel, Vipul R. (2010). "Retropubic, Laparoscopic, and Robot-Assisted Radical Prostatectomy: A Critical Review of Outcomes Reported by High-Volume Centers". Journal of Endourology. 24 (12): 2003–15. doi:10.1089/end.2010.0295. PMC 3122926. PMID 20942686.
- Patel, Vipul R.; Palmer, Kenneth J.; Coughlin, Geoff; Samavedi, Srinivas (2008). "Robot-Assisted Laparoscopic Radical Prostatectomy: Perioperative Outcomes of 1500 Cases". Journal of Endourology. 22 (10): 2299–305. doi:10.1089/end.2008.9711. PMID 18837657.
- Patel, Vipul R.; Coelho, Rafael F.; Palmer, Kenneth J.; Rocco, Bernardo (2009). "Periurethral Suspension Stitch During Robot-Assisted Laparoscopic Radical Prostatectomy: Description of the Technique and Continence Outcomes". European Urology. 56 (3): 472–8. doi:10.1016/j.eururo.2009.06.007. hdl:11380/1128652. PMID 19560260.
- Patel, Vipul R.; Sivaraman, Ananthakrishnan; Coelho, Rafael F.; Chauhan, Sanket; Palmer, Kenneth J.; Orvieto, Marcelo A.; Camacho, Ignacio; Coughlin, Geoff; Rocco, Bernardo (2011). "Pentafecta: A New Concept for Reporting Outcomes of Robot-Assisted Laparoscopic Radical Prostatectomy". European Urology. 59 (5): 702–7. doi:10.1016/j.eururo.2011.01.032. hdl:11380/1128582. PMID 21296482.
