= NeuroArm =

NeuroArm is an engineering research surgical robot specifically designed for neurosurgery. It is the first image-guided, MR-compatible surgical robot that has the capability to perform both microsurgery and stereotaxy.

IMRIS, Inc. acquired NeuroArm assets in 2010, and the company is working to develop a next generation of the technology for worldwide commercialization. It will be integrated with the VISIUS(TM) Surgical Theatre under the name SYMBIS(TM) Surgical System.

== Design ==
NeuroArm was designed to be image-guided and can perform procedures inside an MRI. NeuroArm includes two remote detachable manipulators on a mobile base, a workstation and a system control cabinet. For biopsy-stereotaxy, either the left or right arm is transferred to a stereotactic platform that attaches to the MR bore. The procedure is performed with image-guidance, as MR images are acquired in near real-time. The end-effectors interface with surgical tools which are based on standard neurosurgical instruments.

End-effectors are equipped with three-dimensional force-sensors, providing the sense of touch. The surgeon seated at the workstation controls the robot using force feedback hand controllers. The workstation recreates the sight and sensation of microsurgery by displaying the surgical site and 3D MRI displays, with superimposed tools. NeuroArm enables remote manipulation of the surgical tools from a control room adjacent to the surgical suite. It was designed to function within the environment of 1.5 and 3.0 tesla intraoperative MRI systems. As neuroArm is MR-compatible, stereotaxy can be performed inside the bore of the magnet with near real-time image guidance. NeuroArm possesses the dexterity to perform microsurgery, outside of the MRI system.

Telerobotic operations both inside and outside the magnet are performed using specialized tool sets based on standard neurosurgical instruments, adapted to the end effectors. Using these, NeuroArm is able to cut and manipulate soft tissue, dissect tissue planes, suture, biopsy, electrocauterize, aspirate and irrigate.

== History ==
The project began in 2002 when Daryl, B.J., and Don Seaman provided $2 million to fund the design efforts. Dr. Garnette Sutherland and his group established a collaboration with the Canadian space engineering company MacDonald Dettwiler and Associates (MDA). Close collaboration between MDA's robotic engineers and University of Calgary physicians, nurses, and scientists contributed to the design and development of NeuroArm. Official launch of the project was on April 17, 2007.

NeuroArm was designed to take full advantage of the imaging environment provided by intraoperative MRI. The ability to couple near real-time, high resolution images to robotic technologies provides the surgeon with image guidance, precision, accuracy, and dexterity. MDA's engineers were immersed in the operating room to study typical tool and surgeon motions in order to use biomimicry for effective design of the computer-assisted surgical device. The OR environment, personnel, surgical rhythm and instrumentation remain unchanged. The surgeon, sitting at the workstation, is provided a virtual environment that recreates the sight, sound, and touch of surgery. Functions like tremor filtering and motion scaling were applied to increase precision and accuracy while functions like no-go zones and linear lock were applied to enhance safety. Surgical tools near the patient's head are incapable of fully independent movement and are slaved to the surgeon’s movement at all times. Pre-planned automatic motions are used to move the robot arms away from the patient's head for manual tool exchange, and then return them to the original position and orientation.

On May 12, 2008, the first image-guided MR-compatible robotic neurosurgical procedure was performed at University of Calgary by Dr. Sutherland using the NeuroArm.
