= Lindbergh operation =

2001 French tele-surgical operation

The Lindbergh operation was a complete tele-surgical operation carried out by a team of French surgeons located in New York on a patient in Strasbourg, France (over a distance of several thousand miles) using telecommunications solutions based on high-speed services and sophisticated Zeus surgical robot. The operation was performed successfully on September 7, 2001, by Professor Jacques Marescaux and his team from the IRCAD (Institute for Research into Cancer of the Digestive System). This was the first time in medical history that a technical solution proved capable of reducing the time delay inherent to long-distance transmissions sufficiently to make this type of procedure possible. The name was derived from the American aviator Charles Lindbergh, because he was the first person to fly solo across the Atlantic Ocean.

== Details of the procedure ==
The operation involved minimally invasive surgery: The 45-minute procedure consisted of a cholecystectomy on a 68-year-old female patient in surgical ward A in Strasbourg Civil Hospital, in Eastern France. From New York, the surgeon controlled the arms of the ZEUS Robotic Surgical System, designed by Computer Motion, to operate on the patient. The link between the robotic system and the surgeon was provided by a high-speed fiberoptic service deployed thanks to the combined efforts of several France Telecom group entities.

Commenting on the operation, Professor Marescaux said:

I believe that this demonstration of the feasibility of a completely safe remotely performed surgical procedure—and notably the first trans-Atlantic operation—ushers in the third revolution we've seen in the field of surgery in the past ten years.

The first was the arrival of minimally invasive surgery, enabling procedures to be performed with guidance by a camera, meaning that the abdomen and thorax do not have to be opened. The second was the introduction of computer-assisted surgery, where artificial intelligence enhances the safety of the surgeon's movements during a procedure, rendering them more accurate, while introducing the concept of distance between the surgeon and the patient. It was thus a natural extrapolation to imagine that this distance—currently several meters in the operating room—could potentially be up to several thousand kilometers.
This is what we have just demonstrated thanks to the combined technical prowess of Computer Motion, which created the digital robot required, and France Telecom, which was able to deploy a broadband transmission service with optimized compression, thus limiting the time delay between the command of the action and its return on the monitor to a level that is virtually imperceptible to the human eye.

The demonstration of the feasibility of a trans-Atlantic procedure—dubbed 'Operation Lindbergh' is a richly symbolic milestone. It lays the foundations for the globalization of surgical procedures, making it possible to imagine that a surgeon could perform an operation on a patient anywhere in the world.

== Project partners ==
The surgery was the result of a closely coordinated partnership between IRCAD, the France Télécom group and Computer Motion, the developer of Zeus surgical robotic systems. The EITS (European Institute of Telesurgery) was also involved.

== Computer Motion - Zeus Telesurgery System ==
The Zeus robotic system was developed in mid 1990s to enable a surgeon in the OR to perform the operation seated at surgeon console a few meters away vs. traditional surgery where surgeon was at the OR table and next to the patient. The telesurgery project named Lindbergh operation required the Zeus robotic system to be modified so the surgeon is thousands of miles away from the OR table. There were many challenges to overcome: Zeus system was an FDA cleared surgical system and none of its software could be adjusted due to the clearance, and also in part because of lack of assigned engineering resources to the project as main focus of the company was on next generation Zeus projects including redesign of the surgeon console from "instrument handle control" to "instrument tip control". This project was internally assigned in late 1999 to one of Computer Motion's seasoned engineers, Moji Ghodoussi, Ph.D. to manage, with engineering lead assigned to Sudipto Sur, Ph.D. Significant challenges: technical, operational, business, personnel, regulatory, and more were met along the way, which at a later date will be published either here or under a separate page that will shed light for future teams innovating in fields of technology in general and surgery in particular.

== See also ==
- Laparoscopic surgery
- Remote surgery
- Robotic surgery
