= Robotic surgery =

Surgery performed with robotic systems

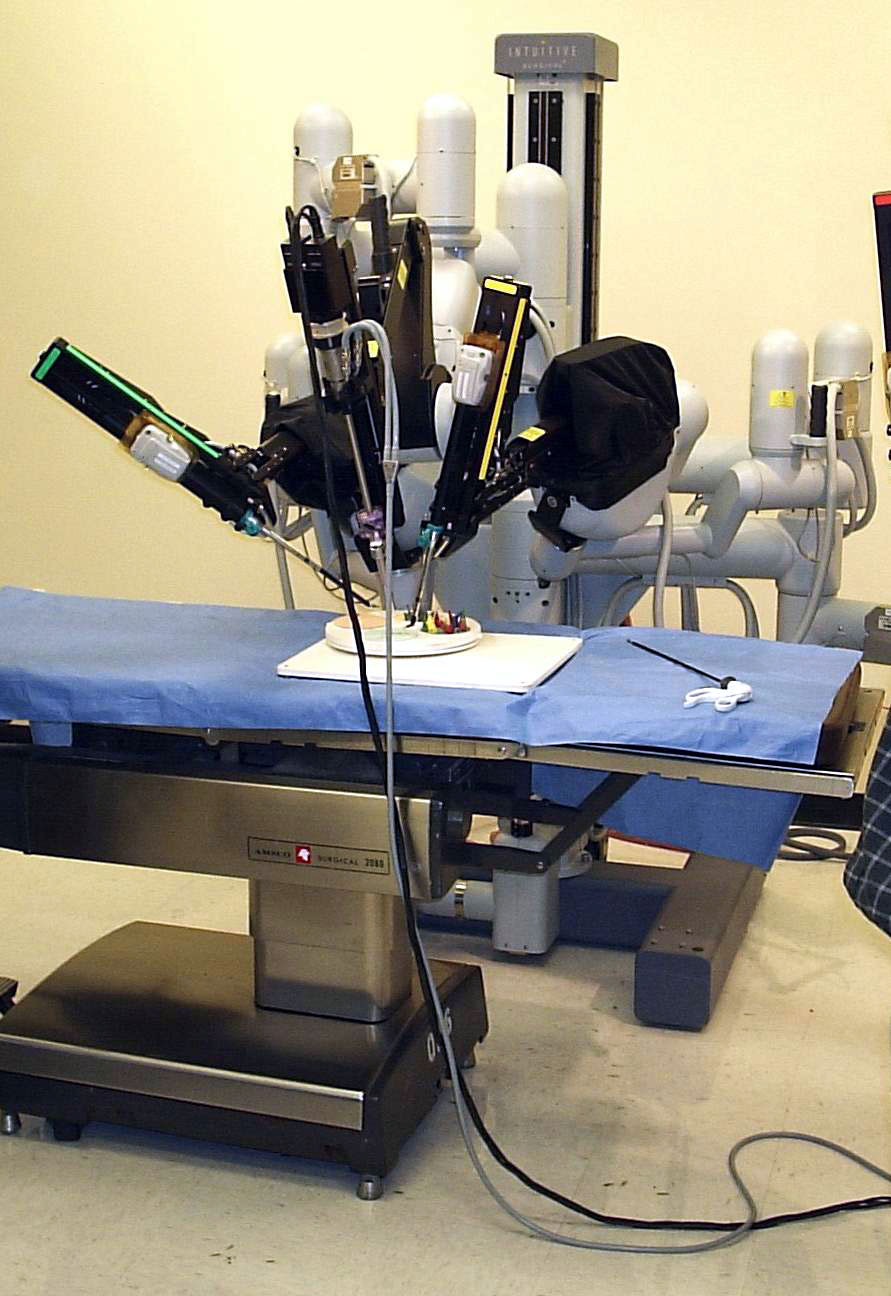
- A robotically assisted surgical system used for prostatectomies, cardiac valve repair and gynecologic surgical procedures
- Other names: Robotically-assisted surgery

Robotic surgery or robot-assisted surgery is any type of surgical procedure that is performed with the use of robotic systems. Robotically assisted surgery was developed with the primary goal of overcoming the limitations of pre-existing minimally invasive surgical procedures, alongside enhancing the capabilities (for example, increasing their work precision) of surgeons performing open surgeries.

In robotically assisted minimally-invasive surgery, the surgeon uses either a remote manipulator or a computer control system to perform dissection, hemostasis, and resection.

- A telemanipulator (e.g. the da Vinci Surgical System) is a system of remotely controlled manipulators that enables a surgeon to perform the surgery in real-time under stereoscopic vision from a control console separate from the operating table. In this case, the surgical robot is docked next to the patient, while the robotic arms carry out endoscopy-like maneuvers via end-effectors inserted through specially designed trocars. A surgical assistant and a scrub nurse are often still needed scrubbed at the tableside to help switch effector instruments or provide additional suction or temporary tissue retraction using endoscopic grasping instruments.
- In computer-controlled systems, the surgeon uses a computer system to relay control data and direct the robotic arms and their end-effectors, even though these systems still possess the ability to use telemanipulators for their input. One of the primary advantages of using the computerized method is that it does not require the surgeon to be physically present on campus to perform the procedure, leading to the possibility for remote surgery and even AI-assisted or automated procedures.

The capital barrier to robotic surgery has decreased as lower-cost, modular systems like Medtronic's Hugo and CMR Surgical's Versius enter the market as alternative offerings to existing platforms. While utilizing a robotic platform typically adds $1,500 to $3,000 in direct operating room expenses compared to traditional laparoscopy, health economic analyses evaluating the total episode of care suggest that this premium is often offset by downstream savings from shorter hospital stays, lower complication rates, and significantly reduced rates of conversion to open surgery.

== History ==
The concept of using standard hand grips to control manipulators and cameras of various sizes down to sub-miniature was described in the Robert Heinlein story 'Waldo' in August 1942, which also mentioned brain surgery. The first robot to assist in surgery was the Arthrobot, which was developed in Canada by a team led by biomedical engineer James McEwen and UBC engineering physics gradudate Geof Auchinleck, in collaboration with orthopedic surgeon Dr. Brian Day, who played a foundational role in its development. The Arthrobot was first used by Dr. Day in surgery in Vancouver Canada in 1983. Designed to assist in arthroscopic surgeries, the Arthrobot responded to the surgeon’s voice commands to manipulate and position the patient’s limb during surgical procedures. Eventually, over 60 arthroscopic surgical procedures were performed over the period of the first 12 months (in the year 1985), and a National Geographic video, The Robotics Revolution, featured the device. Furthermore, among other related robotic devices that were developed at the same time was a surgical scrub nurse robot, which handed operative instruments on voice command, and a medical laboratory robotic arm. A YouTube video entitled Arthrobot – the world's first surgical robot illustrates some of these in operation.

The next important milestone took place in 1985, when the first brain biopsy under CT guidance with the assistance of a robotic arm, PUMA560, was performed. In 1985, a robot, the Unimation Puma 200, was used to orient a needle for a brain biopsy while under CT guidance during a neurological procedure. In the late 1980s, Imperial College London Dr Muthiah Senthil Nathan and Prof Dr John Wikham developed a surgical robotic system, PROBOT, which was then used to perform prostatic surgery. Some of the advantages of this robot included its relatively small size, accuracy, and an absence of fatigue for the surgeon. In the 1990s, computer-controlled surgical devices began to emerge, enabling greater precision and control in surgical procedures. One of the most significant milestones in this period was the development of the da Vinci Surgical System, which was approved by the Food and Drug Administration (FDA) for use in surgical procedures in 2000 (Intuitive Surgical, 2021). The da Vinci system utilizes robotic arms to manipulate surgical instruments, enabling surgeons to perform complex surgical procedures with a significantly higher level of accuracy and control. Additionally, in 1992, the ROBODOC was introduced, eventually revolutionizing orthopedic surgery by being able to assist with hip replacement surgeries. The latter was the first surgical robot to receive the FDA's official approval, which occurred in 2008. The ROBODOC from Integrated Surgical Systems (working closely with IBM) could mill out precise fittings in the femur for hip replacement. The purpose of the ROBODOC was to replace the previous method of carving out a femur for an implant, the use of a mallet and broach/rasp.

Further development of robotic systems was carried out by SRI International and Intuitive Surgical with the introduction of the da Vinci Surgical System and Computer Motion with the AESOP and the ZEUS robotic surgical system. The first robotic surgery was performed at The Ohio State University Medical Center in Columbus, Ohio, under the direction of a renowned American cardiothoracic surgeon, Robert E. Michler.

When publicly introduced in 1994, AESOP represented a breakthrough in robotic surgery, as it was the first laparoscopic camera holder to be granted the FDA's approval for commercial use. Furthermore, the U.S. government space agency NASA was among companies, governmental institutions, and agencies that provided research funding to the company Computer Motion, which produced AESOP, due to its goal of creating a robotic arm that can be used in space; however, this project eventually moved in the direction of medical science, resulting in the development of a camera used in laparoscopic procedures. In 1996, a voice control system was installed in the AESOP 2000 surgical robot, followed in 1998 by the function of seven degrees of freedom (7 DOF), which enhanced the AESOP 3000 robotic system, effectively enabling it to mimic a functional human hand.

The ZEUS robotic surgical system was commercially introduced in 1998, marking the inception of telerobotics, also known as telepresence surgery, where the surgeon conducts the surgical procedure remotely, navigating the robot through a console, while the robot performs the procedure on the patient. ZEUS was used for the first time during a gynecological surgery in 1997 to reconnect Fallopian tubes in Cleveland, Ohio. Afterwards, it was used on several other surgical procedures, including a beating heart coronary artery bypass graft in October 1999, and the Lindbergh Operation, which was a cholecystectomy performed remotely in September 2001. In 2003, ZEUS made its most prominent mark in cardiac surgery after successfully harvesting the left internal mammary arteries in 19 patients, all of whom had very successful clinical outcomes.

The original telesurgery robotic system that the da Vinci was based on was developed at Stanford Research Institute International in Menlo Park, California, financially supported by DARPA and NASA. A demonstration of an open bowel anastomosis was given to the Association of Military Surgeons of the US (AMSUS). Although the telesurgical robot was originally intended to facilitate remotely performed surgery on the battlefield and in different remote locations or hardly accessible environments to reduce casualties, it turned out to be more useful for minimally invasive on-site surgery. The patents for the early prototype were sold to Intuitive Surgical in Mountain View, California. The da Vinci senses the surgeon's hand movements and translates them electronically into scaled-down micro-movements to manipulate the tiny proprietary instruments. It also detects and filters out any tremors in the surgeon's hand movements, so that they are not duplicated robotically. The camera used in the system provides a true stereoscopic picture transmitted to a surgeon's console. Compared to the ZEUS, the da Vinci robot is attached to trocars to the surgical table, and can imitate the human wrist. In 2000, the da Vinci obtained FDA approval for general laparoscopic procedures and became the first operative surgical robot in the US. Examples of using the da Vinci system include the first robotically assisted heart bypass (performed in Germany) in May 1998, and the first performed in the United States in September 1999; and the first all-robotic-assisted kidney transplant, performed in January 2009. The da Vinci Si was released in April 2009 and initially sold for $1.75 million.

In 2005, a surgical technique was documented in canine and cadaveric models called the transoral robotic surgery (TORS) for the da Vinci robot surgical system, as it was the only FDA-approved robot to perform head and neck surgery. In 2006, three patients underwent resection of the tongue using this technique. The results were more clear visualization of the cranial nerves, lingual nerves, and lingual artery, and the patients had a faster recovery to normal swallowing. In May 2006, the first artificial intelligence doctor-conducted unassisted robotic surgery was successfully performed on a 34-year-old male to correct a heart arrhythmia. The surgery's outcome was rated as better than an above-average human surgeon. The machine had a database of 10,000 similar operations, and so, in the words of its designers, was "more than qualified to operate on any patient." In August 2007, Dr. Sijo Parekattil of the Robotics Institute and Center for Urology (Winter Haven Hospital and University of Florida) performed the first robotic-assisted microsurgery procedure of denervation of the spermatic cord for chronic testicular pain. In February 2008, Dr. Mohan S. Gundeti of the University of Chicago Comer Children's Hospital performed the first robotic pediatric neurogenic bladder reconstruction.

On 12 May 2008, the first image-guided MR-compatible robotic neurosurgical procedure was performed at the University of Calgary by Dr. Garnette Sutherland using the NeuroArm. In June 2008, the German Aerospace Centre (DLR) presented a robotic system for minimally invasive surgery, the MiroSurge neurosurgical robotic system. In September 2010, the Eindhoven University of Technology announced the development of the Sofie surgical system, the first surgical robot to employ force feedback. In September 2010, the first robotic operation on the femoral vasculature was performed at the University Medical Centre Ljubljana by a team of surgeons led by Dr. Borut Geršak.

In 2017, the first robotic system designed specifically for microsurgery and supermicrosurgery, the MUSA system, developed by Microsure (Eindhoven, the Netherlands) was introduced. It was first used clinically at Maastricht University Medical Center+ for lymphaticovenous anastomosis (LVA) procedures in patients with lymphedema.

In 2019, the Versius Surgical System was launched by the British medical device company CMR Surgical. It seeks to challenge the Da Vinci surgical system on the global market, claiming its products are more flexible and versatile, with independent modular arms that are "quick and easy to set up." Versius' small-scale design signifies that the system is suitable for virtually any operating theater and can be operated at either a standing or a sitting position.

While robot-assisted surgery previously relied on specialized hardware, remote-controlled surgeries using general-purpose humanoid robots were experimentally conducted in 2026, demonstrating new possibilities.

== Uses ==
=== Ophthalmology ===
Although ophthalmology was long considered one of the frontiers for robotic-assisted surgeries, in recent decades, several breakthroughs in medicine and health technology paved the way for the development of advanced surgical robotic systems capable of successfully performing ophthalmologic surgeries.

- PRECEYES Surgical System is being used for vitreoretinal surgeries. This is a single-arm robot that is telemanipulated by a surgeon. This system attaches to the head of the operating room table and provides surgeons with increased precision with the assistance of the intuitive motion controller. Preceyes is the only robotic instrument to be CE certified. Some other companies like Forsight Robotics, Acusurgical that raised 5.75 M€ (France), and Horizon (US) are working in this field.
- The da Vinci Surgical System, though not specifically designed for ophthalmic procedures, uses telemanipulation to perform pterygium repairs and ex vivo corneal surgeries.

=== Heart ===
Some examples of heart surgery being assisted by robotic surgery systems include:

- Atrial septal defect repair – the repair of a hole between the two upper chambers of the heart,
- Mitral valve repair – the repair of the valve that prevents blood from regurgitating back into the upper heart chambers during contractions of the heart,
- Coronary artery bypass – rerouting of blood supply by bypassing blocked arteries that provide blood to the heart.

=== Thoracic ===
Robotic surgery has become more widespread in thoracic surgery for mediastinal pathologies, pulmonary pathologies, and, more recently, complex esophageal surgery.

The da Vinci Xi system is used for lung and mediastinal mass resection. This minimally invasive approach is a comparable alternative to video-assisted thoracoscopic surgery (VATS) and the standard open thoracic surgery. Although VATS is the less expensive option, the robotic-assisted approach offers benefits such as 3D visualizations with seven degrees of freedom and improved dexterity while having equivalent perioperative outcomes.

=== ENT ===
The first successful robot-assisted cochlear implantation in a person was performed in Bern, Switzerland, in 2017. Surgical robots have been developed for use at various stages of cochlear implantation, including drilling through the mastoid bone, accessing the inner ear, and inserting the electrode into the cochlea.

Advantages of robot-assisted cochlear implantation include improved accuracy, resulting in fewer mistakes during electrode insertion and better hearing outcomes for patients. The surgeon uses image-guided surgical planning to program the robot based on the patient's individual anatomy. This helps the implant team to predict where the contacts of the electrode array will be located within the cochlea, which can assist with audio processor fitting post-surgery. The surgical robots also allow surgeons to reach the inner ear in a minimally invasive way.

Challenges that still need to be addressed include safety, time, efficiency, and cost.

Surgical robots have also been shown to be useful for electrode insertion with pediatric patients.

=== Dentistry and Orthodontics ===
Over the past 25 years, the use of robotics in dentistry has flourished. The need for safer, more precise, and more time-efficient procedures has become a new pinnacle in the medical community and has called for further innovation and technology. With the successful incorporation of robotics in other fields, such as a stereotactic brain biopsy in 1985 and the RoboDoc for hip replacements used since 1992, companies and medical professionals all over the world have looked to create robotic technology for other medical areas. The ceaseless interest in medical technology has continuously galvanized research within the dental field.

The first proof-of-concept dental procedure was performed in 2002 in Germany at the University Hospital of Heidelberg. Haßfeld et al. worked to perform the first-ever mock dental implantation attempt by test drilling a phantom mandible. A series of 16 trials with a total of 48 drillings was performed on the phantom mandible representing a patient's head. The procedures had an average of 1-2mm imprecision throughout the drillings, which is relatively accurate when compared to the average imprecision of drillings done by hand. The proof of concept was considered successful and proved that with more dedication and focus by the global medical engineering community, robot-assisted and even autonomous dental procedures were not out of reach. Over the next 15 years, researchers from all over the globe dedicated a significant amount of time and effort to innovate upon the German 'TomoRob' Software that was used in the original proof of concept. Many of these companies have worked to improve the reliability of creating 3D models of patients' mouths, as well as the necessary digital technology and machines to properly assess a patient's needs and provide them with care.

In 2017, Neocis, the leading US-based dental robotics company from Miami, Florida, was the first company to get government approval (By the United States FDA) to work on developing machines and software for Computer-assisted surgery. In 2019 Neocis' FDA approval was extended to allow Neocis to use other dental resins and acrylic materials in Dental restoration such as a filling or a Crown (dental restoration). Some of the approved resins that Neocis and other companies like Perceptive and RemeBot have been interested in are Alike pattern resin, Triad C&B, and Cool Temp Natural. In 2020, the FDA gave Neocis clearance to use their technology to work on Full arch restoration procedures with YOMI. In 2022, the most recent FDA approval for Neocis was made, allowing YOMI to be used for alveoloplasty (bone reduction). Neocis continues to provide dental research and innovate on YOMI technology and work to extend the list of procedures that can be completed by dental robotics.

Another major development in 2017 was the first ever autonomous implant that was performed at Air Force Medical University in Xi'an, Shaanxi, China. The procedure was a breakthrough in testing at the time, as the procedure itself was performed autonomously by the robot. Before the procedure, a CT scan was performed in order to get a dental graft and to assess how the procedure would be performed. The procedure was planned by the doctors present, but was performed by the robot without any doctor assistance. This procedure was a major breakthrough in dental robotics as it presents the possibility of fully autonomous dental procedures with higher accuracy and reliability than standard dental practices. After the success of the autonomous dental implant in China, a competitor for Neocis, RemeBot, emerged, and in 2018, it was the first robot-assistant dental company to get National Medical Products Administration certification to publish their dental-implantology machines and sell them to the public sector of dentistry. Since the success of RemeBot in China and Neocis in the US, many other upcoming companies, such as Straumann in Switzerland and Yakebot in China, have been developing technology and machines to compete with RemeBot and Neocis. Both of these upcoming companies have seen success in the dental robotics field and are currently working to pass regulatory requirements and get approval to be publicly published and used by dental offices.

As dental robotics develops worldwide, with a number of countries attempting to design their own versions of robotic dental implantology, there has been a increase of dental offices who are directing their attention to this new technology.

=== Gastrointestinal ===
Multiple types of procedures have been performed with either the 'Zeus' or da Vinci robot systems, including bariatric surgery and gastrectomy for cancer. Surgeons at various universities initially published case series demonstrating different techniques and the feasibility of GI surgery using the robotic devices. Specific procedures have been more fully evaluated, specifically esophageal fundoplication for the treatment of gastroesophageal reflux and Heller myotomy for the treatment of achalasia.

Robot-assisted pancreatectomies have been found to be associated with "longer operating time, lower estimated blood loss, a higher spleen-preservation rate, and shorter hospital stay[s]" than laparoscopic pancreatectomies; there was "no significant difference in transfusion, conversion to open surgery, overall complications, severe complications, pancreatic fistula, severe pancreatic fistula, ICU stay, total cost, and 30-day mortality between the two groups."

=== Gynecology ===
The first report of robotic surgery in gynecology was published in 1999 by the Cleveland Clinic. The adoption of robotic surgery has contributed to the increase in minimally invasive surgery for gynecologic disease. Gynecologic procedures may take longer with robot-assisted surgery, and the rate of complications may be higher, but there are not enough high-quality studies to know at the present time. In the United States, robotic-assisted hysterectomy for benign conditions was shown to be more expensive than conventional laparoscopic hysterectomy in 2015, with little to no difference in overall complication rate.

This includes the use of the da Vinci surgical system in benign gynecology and gynecologic oncology. Robotic surgery can be used to treat fibroids, abnormal periods, endometriosis, ovarian tumors, uterine prolapse, and female cancers. Using the robotic system, gynecologists can perform hysterectomies, myomectomies, and lymph node biopsies. The Hominis robotic system developed by Momentis Surgical™ is aimed to provide a robotic platform for natural orifice transluminal endoscopic surgery (NOTES) for myomectomy through the vagina.

A 2017 review of surgical removal of the uterus and cervix for early cervical cancer concluded that robotic and laparoscopic surgical procedures resulted in similar outcomes with respect to the cancer.

=== Bone ===
Robots are used in orthopedic surgery.

ROBODOC is the first active robotic system that performs some of the surgical actions in a total hip arthroplasty (THA). It is programmed preoperatively using data from computer tomography (CT) scans. This allows the surgeon to choose the optimal size and design for the replacement hip.

Acrobot and Rio are semi-active robotic systems that are used in THA. It consists of a drill bit that is controlled by the surgeon; however, the robotic system does not allow any movement outside the predetermined boundaries.

Mazor X is used in spinal surgeries to assist surgeons with placing pedicle screw instrumentation. Inaccuracy when placing a pedicle screw can result in neurovascular injury or construct failure. Mazor X functions by using templating imaging to locate itself to the target location of where the pedicle screw is needed.

=== Spine ===
Robotic devices started to be used in minimally invasive spine surgery starting in the mid-2000s. As of 2014, there were too few randomized clinical trials to judge whether robotic spine surgery is more or less safe than other approaches.

As of 2019, the application of robotics in spine surgery has mainly been limited to pedicle screw insertion for spinal fixation. In addition, the majority of studies on robot-assisted spine surgery have investigated lumbar or lumbosacral vertebrae only. Studies on use of robotics for placing screws in the cervical and thoracic vertebrae are limited.

=== Transplant surgery ===
The first fully robotic kidney transplantations were performed in the late 2000s. It may allow kidney transplantations in people who are obese who could not otherwise have the procedure. Weight loss, however, is the preferred initial effort.

In 2021, the team at Cedars-Sinai Medical Center in Los Angeles, California, completed the world's first robotic lung transplant, allowing a minimally invasive approach to the procedure.

=== General surgery ===
With regards to robotic surgery, this type of procedure is currently best suited for single-quadrant procedures, in which the operations can be performed on any one of the four quadrants of the abdomen. Cost disadvantages are applied with procedures such as a cholecystectomy and fundoplication, but they are suitable opportunities for surgeons to advance their robotic surgery skills.

=== Hernia and abdominal wall surgery ===
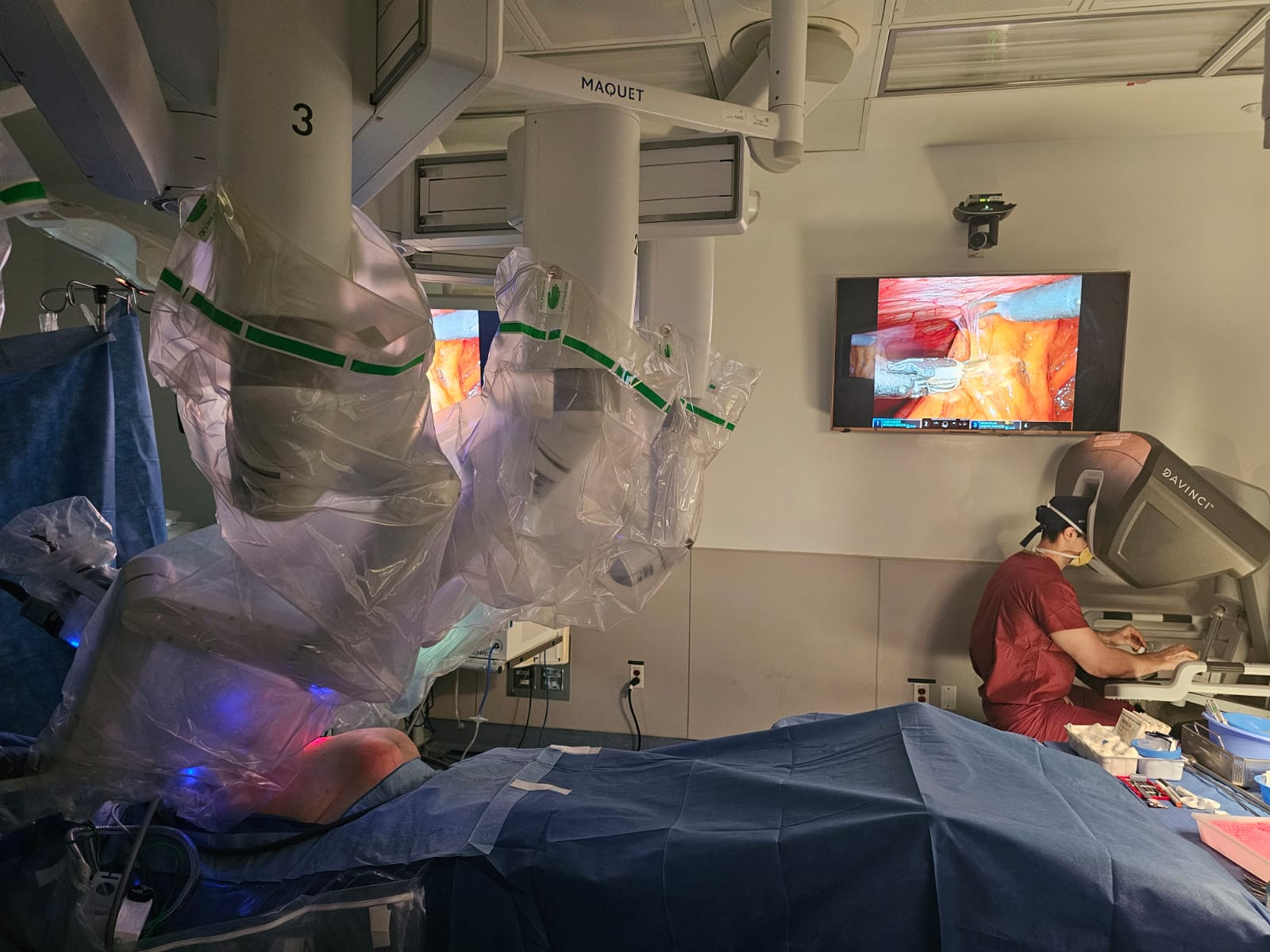
A surgeon at the Columbia Hernia Center operates on a patient with a large hernia using the robotic platform.

Over the past several decades, there have been great advances in the field of abdominal wall and hernia surgery, especially when it comes to robotic-assisted surgery. Unlike laparoscopic surgery, the robotic platform allows for the correction of large hernia defects with specialized techniques that would traditionally only be performed via an open approach. Compared to open surgery, robotic surgery for hernia repair can reduce pain, length of hospital stay, and improve outcomes. As the robotic instruments have 6 degrees of articulation, freedom of movement and ergonomics are significantly improved compared to laparoscopy.

The first robotic inguinal hernia repairs were done in conjunction with prostatectomies in 2007. The first ventral hernia repairs were performed robotically in 2009. Since then, the field has rapidly expanded to include most types of reconstruction, including anterior as well as posterior component separation.

With newer techniques such as direct access into the abdominal wall, major reconstruction of large hernias can be done without even entering the abdominal cavity. Due to its complexity, however, major reconstruction done robotically should be undertaken at advanced hernia centers such as the Columbia Hernia Center in New York City, NY, USA. The American Hernia Society and the European Hernia Society are moving towards specialty designation for hernia centers that are credentialed for complex hernia surgery, including robotic surgery.

=== Urology ===
Robotic surgery in the field of urology has become common, especially in the United States.

There is inconsistent evidence of benefits compared to standard surgery to justify the increased costs. Some have found tentative evidence of a more complete removal of cancer and fewer side effects from surgery for prostatectomy.

In 2000, the first robot-assisted laparoscopic radical prostatectomy was performed.

Robotic surgery has also been utilized in radical cystectomies. A 2013 review found fewer complications and better short-term outcomes when compared to open technique.

=== Pediatrics ===
Pediatric procedures are also benefiting from robotic surgical systems, considering that a smaller abdominal size in pediatric patients limits the viewing field in most urology procedures. Therefore, robotic surgical systems enable surgeons to overcome these limitations effectively. Robotic technology provides assistance in performing:

- Pyeloplasty – an alternative to the conventional open dismembered pyeloplasty (Anderson-Hynes). Pyeloplasty is the most common robotic-assisted procedure in children.
- Ureteral reimplantation – an alternative to the open intravesical or extravesical surgery.
- Ureteroureterostomy – alternative to the transperitoneal approach.
- Nephrectomy and heminephrectomy – Traditionally done with laparoscopy, it is not likely that a robotic procedure offers a significant advantage due to its high cost.

== Comparison to traditional methods ==
Major advances aided by surgical robots have been remote surgery, minimally invasive surgery, and unmanned surgery. Due to robotic use, the surgery is performed with precision, miniaturization, smaller incisions; decreased blood loss, less pain, and quicker healing time. Articulation beyond normal manipulation and three-dimensional magnification help to result in improved ergonomics. Due to these techniques, there is a reduced duration of hospital stays, blood loss, transfusions, and use of pain medication. The existing open surgery technique has many flaws, such as limited access to the surgical area, long recovery time, long hours of operation, blood loss, surgical scars, and marks.

The robot's costs range from $1 million to $2.5 million for each unit, and while its disposable supply cost is normally $1,500 per procedure, the cost of the procedure is higher. Additional surgical training is needed to operate the system. Numerous feasibility studies have been done to determine whether the purchase of such systems is worthwhile. As it stands, opinions differ dramatically. Surgeons report that, although manufacturers of such systems provide training on this new technology, the learning phase is intensive and surgeons must perform 150 to 250 procedures to become adept in their use. Moreover, during the training phase, minimally invasive operations can take up to twice as long as traditional surgery, leading to operating room tie-ups and surgical staff keeping patients under anesthesia for longer periods. Patient surveys indicate they chose the procedure based on expectations of decreased morbidity, improved outcomes, reduced blood loss, and less pain. Additionally, higher expectations may explain higher rates of dissatisfaction and regret.

Compared with other minimally invasive surgery approaches, robot-assisted surgery gives the surgeon better control over the surgical instruments and a better view of the surgical site. In addition, surgeons no longer have to stand throughout the surgery and do not get tired as quickly. Naturally occurring hand tremors are filtered out by the robot's computer software. Finally, the surgical robot can continuously be used by rotating surgery teams. Laparoscopic camera positioning is also significantly steadier with less inadvertent movements under robotic controls than compared to human assistance. The use of mixed reality to support robot-assisted surgery was developed at the Air Force Research Laboratory in 1992 through the creation of "virtual fixtures" that overlay virtual boundaries or guides that assist the human operator and has become a common method for increasing safety and precision.

There are some issues in regards to current robotic surgery usage in clinical applications. There is a lack of haptics in some robotic systems currently in clinical use, which means there is no force feedback, or touch feedback. No interaction between the instrument and the patient is felt. However, recently the Senhance robotic system by Asensus Surgical was developed with haptic feedback in order to improve the interaction between the surgeon and the tissue.

The robots can also be very large, have instrumentation limitations, and there may be issues with multi-quadrant surgery as current devices are solely used for single-quadrant application.

Critics of the system, including the American Congress of Obstetricians and Gynecologists, say there is a steep learning curve for surgeons who adopt the use of the system and that there's a lack of studies that indicate long-term results are superior to results following traditional laparoscopic surgery. Articles in the newly created Journal of Robotic Surgery tend to report on one surgeon's experience.

Complications related to robotic surgeries range from converting the surgery to open, re-operation, permanent injury, damage to viscera and nerve damage. From 2000 to 2011, out of 75 hysterectomies done with robotic surgery, 34 had permanent injury, and 49 had damage to the viscera. Prostatectomies were more prone to permanent injury, nerve damage and visceral damage as well. Very minimal surgeries in a variety of specialties had to actually be converted to open or be re-operated on, but most did sustain some kind of damage or injury. For example, out of seven coronary artery bypass grafting, one patient had to go under re-operation. It is important that complications are captured, reported and evaluated to ensure the medical community is better educated on the safety of this new technology. If something was to go wrong in a robot-assisted surgery, it is difficult to identify culpability, and the safety of the practice will influence how quickly and widespread these practices are used.

One drawback of the use of robotic surgery is the risk of mechanical failure of the system and instruments. A study from July 2005 to December 2008 was conducted to analyze the mechanical failures of the da Vinci Surgical System at a single institute. During this period, a total of 1797 robotic surgeries were performed used 4 da Vinci surgical systems. There were 43 cases (2.4%) of mechanical failure, including 24 (1.3%) cases of mechanical failure or malfunction and 19 (1.1%) cases of instrument malfunction. Additionally, one open and two laparoscopic conversions (0.17%) were performed. Therefore, the chance of mechanical failure or malfunction was found to be rare, with the rate of converting to an open or laparoscopic procedure very low.

There are also current methods of robotic surgery being marketed and advertised online. Removal of a cancerous prostate has been a popular treatment through internet marketing. Internet marketing of medical devices are more loosely regulated than pharmaceutical promotions. Many sites that claim the benefits of this type of procedure had failed to mention risks and also provided unsupported evidence. There is an issue with government and medical societies promotion a production of balanced educational material. In the US alone, many websites promotion robotic surgery fail to mention any risks associated with these types of procedures, and hospitals providing materials largely ignore risks, overestimate benefits and are strongly influenced by the manufacturer.

== In popular culture ==
The expansion of medical insurance coverage for robotic cardiac surgery in Japan was a central plot point in the 2018 Japanese television drama Black Pean. The show dramatized the conflict between traditional surgical techniques and the adoption of modern surgical technology, using the name "Darwin" to represent the da Vinci surgical system. Dr. Gou Watanabe of the Newhart Watanabe International Hospital, a pioneer of heart surgery in Japan, provided technical medical support for the series.

The final level of the 2016 stealth game Hitman takes place in an advanced medical center, with one of the targets undergoing surgery through a telemanipulator.

== See also ==
- Bone segment navigation
- Computer-assisted surgery
- Diagnostic robot
- Minimally invasive surgery
- Patient registration
- Stereolithography (medicine)
- Surgical Segment Navigator
- Telemedicine
- Neuralink
