= Garnette Sutherland =

Canadian neurosurgeon and researcher (born 1952)

Garnette Roy Sutherland FRCSC, is a Canadian neurosurgeon and professor of neurosurgery (clinical neurosciences) at the University of Calgary. He is known for his research into MRI technology, such as intraoperative MRI, and the NeuroArm robotic system.

He graduated from the University of Manitoba, with a Bachelors of Science in Chemistry, in 1974, and an M.D degree in 1978. Later, going on to do a neurosurgery residency under Charles George Drake at the University of Western Ontario.

Sutherland is current serves as a Professor at the University of Calgary in their department of Neurosciences.

== Honours ==
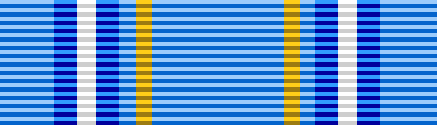

Ribbon	Description	Notes
	Order of Canada (CM)	Member of the Order of Canada 2011; Awarded for "dramatic improvements in the safety and success of brain surgeries"
	Alberta Order of Excellence	Member of Alberta order of Excellence 2024
	Queen Elizabeth II Diamond Jubilee Medal	
	Queen Elizabeth II Platinum Jubilee Medal (Alberta)	Awarded in 2022
	NASA Exceptional Technology Achievement Medal	Awarded in 2015 for his work on NeuroArm Technology
