= MiroSurge =

MiroSurge is a presently prototypic robotic system (as of May 2012) designed mainly for research in minimally invasive telesurgery. In the described configuration, the system is designed according to the master slave principle and enables the operator to remotely control minimally invasive surgical instruments including force/torque feedback. The scenario is developed at the Institute of Robotics and Mechatronics within the German Aerospace Center (DLR).

The system consists of

- Three to five MIRO robot arms at the operation table,
- Minimally invasive instruments (MICA),
- a HD Stereo endoscope,
- surgical workstation with two force/torque reflecting input devices and stereo vision, and
- a planning suite for the robotic setup.

Besides the semi-autonomous motion compensation, the system exclusively is a telemanipulator at any time and the surgeon at the workstation has full control of the surgical instruments. To change instruments or to introduce the robot setup, and for safety reasons a surgical assistant is present in the operating room (OR).

== MIRO robot arm ==
MIRO is a lightweight robot (mass: approx. 10 kg, i.e. 353 US oz) with an optimized design for surgical applications.

- Payload approximately 3 kg
- 7 degrees of freedom (DoF)
- Joint-sided torque sensors
- 3 kHz Cartesian control cycle

In the minimally invasive setup MiroSurge, the MIRO arms are mounted directly to the side-rails of the operation table. As the robot has full 6 DoF motion capabilities, the trocar can be located almost arbitrary within the robot's workspace. Due to the additional DoF (joint) of the robot, a nullspace (elbow) motion is possible during operation of the robot, which is utilized for collision avoidance.

== MICA minimally invasive instrument ==
MICA (mass approx. 0,9 kg, i.e. 31.8 US oz) is a robotic instrument for minimally invasive surgery.

- intra corporal universal joint (2DoF)
- scissors, gripper, or a Maryland as a functional tip (1DoF)
- Joint-sided 7DoF force/torque sensor for force feedback
- 3 kHz position control cycle

The instrument MICA is mounted directly to the hollow wrist of the robot MIRO, thus the lost 2DoF of motion due to the trocar in case of the minimally invasive setup MiroSurge are re-established, giving the surgeon full dexterity inside patient's body.

== Surgical workstation ==
For manipulation, the surgeon sits in front of a user console, remotely located from the operation table. The console comprises

- stereo vision of the site of operation on a HD-display and
- two commercially available, fully actuated input devices Sigma.7 (master) with 7DoF of motion dedicated to the left and right hand of the surgeon.

Thereby, the surgeon is able to guide e.g. two robotic instruments MICA (slave) by moving the hand-held input devices according to the desired motion. Visual and haptic feedback is provided to the surgeon by the HD-display in front of him and the force/torque reflecting input devices respectively.

== Planning and registration ==
Concerning an optimized positioning of robotic components and patient in relation to workspace accessibility, research is done within the MiroSurge system concerning pre-operative planning as well as intra-operative registration.

== Intended applications ==
MiroSurge as a system for minimally invasive surgery is intended to operate in the abdominal and thoracic region with two MIRO-robots carrying MICA-instruments and one robot for the stereo-endoscope. According to Tilo Wüsthoff, the industrial designer at the Institute of Robotics and Mechatronics, one of the main purposes of this device is the robot-supported surgery on a beating heart.
