= CMR Surgical =

British medical device company

CMR Surgical Ltd
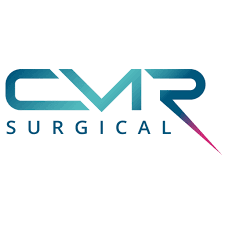
- Industry: Medical devices & equipment
- Founded: 2014
- Founder: Luke Hares, Keith Marshall, Paul Roberts, Mark Slack, Martin Frost
- Headquarters: Cambridge, United Kingdom
- Products: Surgical robot
- Number of employees: 650 approx
- Website: https://cmrsurgical.com

CMR Surgical is a British medical device company based in Cambridge. It produces a robot-assisted surgery system called Versius. The company achieved Unicorn status in 2019, while in 2021 it received a valuation of $3 billion.

With headquarters at Evolution Business Park, Cambridge and a global manufacturing hub in Ely, Cambridgeshire, the business also has a presence throughout Europe, Latin America, AMEA and Australia. Previously called Cambridge Medical Robotics, it changed name in March 2018.

The Versius Surgical Robotic System is a rival of the established Da Vinci Surgical System and claims to be more flexible and versatile, having independent modular arms which are "quick and easy to set up". Some key patents for the da Vinci system have recently expired.

In the United Kingdom (October 2023), CMR Surgical has 20 NHS hospital partnerships including Guy's and St Thomas' (London), Royal Papworth (Cambridge), Milton Keynes University Hospital, Western General Hospital (Edinburgh), Gloucestershire Royal, Manchester Royal Infirmary, Lister Hospital (Stevenage), West Hertfordshire Teaching Hospitals, The University Hospital of Wales (Cardiff), Ysbyty Gwynedd (Bangor), East Surrey Hospital, Great Western Hospital (Swindon), and Frimley Health (Surrey/Berkshire).

In Australia in 2021, Macquarie University Hospital introduced the company's Versius robotics arm for keyhole surgery, following approval from the Therapeutic Goods Administration.

In India, the 1,000th operation was performed by Professor Dr Raj Nagarkar, from HCG Manavata Cancer Centre, India in 2020. He said, “We are seeing clear patient benefits including reduced pain, and length of stay. Additionally, the open console means I can operate comfortably, helping to reduce physical tiredness from surgery. As far as the patient is concerned, obviously there is less pain, less bleeding and less risk of infection. I feel we need to elaborate on the advantages to the surgeon. Without being glued to the console, I could comfortably relax in a chair and operate. I have done six robotic-assisted procedures in one single day, without getting tired, myself.”

In 2021 CMR Surgical raised $600m at a $3bn valuation during a series D financing round. Escala Capital was its biggest investor followed by SoftBank Vision Fund 2 after the financing round. Notable other investors are GE Healthcare and ABB Technology Ventures. CMR Surgical said the funding was the world's largest private financing round in the medtech sector, citing PitchBook data.

In 2022, the Versius robotic system was adopted for urological procedures in Pakistan and was also indicated for clinical use in thoracic. A successful trial in transthoracic esophagectomy was reported in Nature in October 2022.

In April 2023 CMR Surgical has been honoured in the first ever King's Award for Enterprise within the innovation category for the Versius Surgical Robotic System. Also in April 2023, it was announced that approximately 350 staff were being made redundant. In June 2023, the Engineers gallery opened at the Science Museum, London, featuring CMR Surgical's Versius surgical robot arm and prototype. In September 2023, CMR raised $165 million (£133m) as it prepared for the launch of its Versius soft tissue system into additional markets. (Note: The funding round was led by Ally Bridge Group, Cambridge Innovation Capital, Escala Capital, LGT, Lightrock, RPMI Railpen, SoftBank Vision Fund 2, Tencent and Watrium.) In October 2023, it was announced, the opening of a new manufacturing facility in the UK capable of producing up to 500 Versius systems per annum following a £10 million investment.

In February 2024, CMR Surgical unveiled a significant update to Versius, a new imaging technology to visualise ICG (Indocyanine green), which is a fluorescent dye which is used as an indicator substance which is administered intravenously. It will help perform visual assessment of the vessels, blood flow and related tissue perfusion and biliary anatomy using the 3D visualisation of Versius. In March 2024, CMR Surgical announced that over 20,000 Versius surgical cases have now been completed, the 20,000th case was performed at East and North Hertfordshire NHS Trust, UK. A seven-year-old boy named Reece from Gosport, Hampshire, became the first child in the UK to undergo surgery using the pioneering Versius Surgical Robotic System in 2024. The procedure, aimed at treating a kidney condition, was part of a UK trial led by the NHS, expanding the system's use from adult to pediatric patients. This trial aims to pave the way for more minimally invasive surgeries for children across the UK."
