= Sofie (surgical robot) =

The Surgeon’s Operating Force-feedback Interface Eindhoven (SOFIE) surgical robot is a surgical robot developed at the Eindhoven University of Technology. It was developed as part of a Ph.D. thesis by Dr. Ir. Linda van den Bedem and is the first surgical robot to incorporate force feedback.

== Background ==
The Sofie surgical robot was developed as part of the Ph.D. work of ir. Linda van den Bedem on the improvement of existing surgical systems.

The surgical systems commercially available as of September 2010 (such as the da Vinci Surgical System) all focus on translating movements made by a surgeon at a surgical console into movements by robot arms. However, a great limitation of this generation of robots is a complete lack of any tactile feedback: the surgeon cannot feel what he is doing, so he must rely completely on visual feedback to check his incisions, sutures and so on. A secondary drawback to this generation of robot is the average size and bulkiness, limiting the movements of surgical staff around the table and necessitating time-consuming recalibrations whenever the patient must be moved.

The Sofie robot improves upon the design of the previous generation of surgical robots by adding force feedback to the surgeon's controls, restoring the use of tactile senses that surgeons learn to use in their training.

== Design ==
Like several of the previous generations of surgical robot, Sofie is a master-slave design. The two components (master and slave) are completely separated from each other, however, with all communication between the two taking place over data cables arranged in an overhead wiring boom.

=== The master ===
The master, or control console, is a workstation from which the surgeon controls the robotic arms and surgical tools. The workstation consists of a monitor on which an image of the work area is shown, plus a number of force-feedback joysticks. The console was designed to be a separate module from the slave, which allows it to be placed at some distance from the surgical table; this means that personnel working at the table will not be hampered in their movement by a large control console in the vicinity of the table. The master console was developed by ir. Ron Hendrix.

=== The slave ===
The slave (the actual subject of dr.ir. Van den Bedem's thesis) is a robotic arm frame which can accommodate three independent manipulators (two for surgical tools, one for a camera). The frame for the manipulators is of the type used for pick-and-place robots, allowing the manipulators full freedom of motion in space. This means that the surgeon can also choose the optimal direction of approach for any organ, rather than having to move the patient to suit the machine. Of course the manipulators also provide force feedback through the overhead cable boom.

In addition to having a large degree of freedom, the Sofie slave is also quite compact when compared to the generation of surgical robots in current use. Whereas the current generation requires a large robot arm installation next to the surgical table, the slave is small enough to be clamped onto the surgical bed itself. This means that the slave moves with the bed when the surgical table is moved or adjusted and doesn't have to be adjusted separately for the new position of the table in the operating room.

== Commercial advantages and exploitation ==
Another advantage to the design of Sofie is that its construction is cheaper than that of the previous generation of robot. Although there is no notion yet of what a Sofie-like robot would cost in a commercial offering, it is already clear that the design allows for a robot that costs substantially less than the €1,000,000 average of the da Vinci Surgical System.

As of October 2010, dr.ir. Van den Bedem is investigating the possibilities for commercial exploitation of the basic design. The expectation however, is that any robot could only be available in the market by 2016 at the earliest.
