= Full arch restoration =

Dental procedure

Full arch restoration in dentistry refers to the comprehensive reconstruction or rehabilitation of an entire dental arch, which can include all teeth in the upper or lower jaw. This procedure is also known as full mouth reconstruction or full mouth rehabilitation.

== Overview ==
Full arch restoration involves creating a single prosthesis to replace 10 to 14 teeth. Typically, the front areas of the jaw maintain more bone volume suitable for implants, whereas the back regions often suffer greater bone loss. This sequence occurs due to the typical loss of molars initially, followed by premolars, while the front teeth tend to remain intact for the longest duration. As time passes, there is a noticeable reduction in both the height and width of the alveolar ridge following tooth loss.

=== Indications ===
The indications for full-arch restoration include:

- Complete edentulism: the condition of having all teeth missing in one or both jaws.
- Teeth that are irreparably damaged or loose.
- Severe periodontitis or periodontal disease, particularly when the outlook for treatment is bleak due to the scarcity of remaining teeth.
- Bone tissue loss in the lateral areas allows for the positioning of angled implants.
- Narrow alveolar ridge, which may require guided bone regeneration surgery.

== Types ==
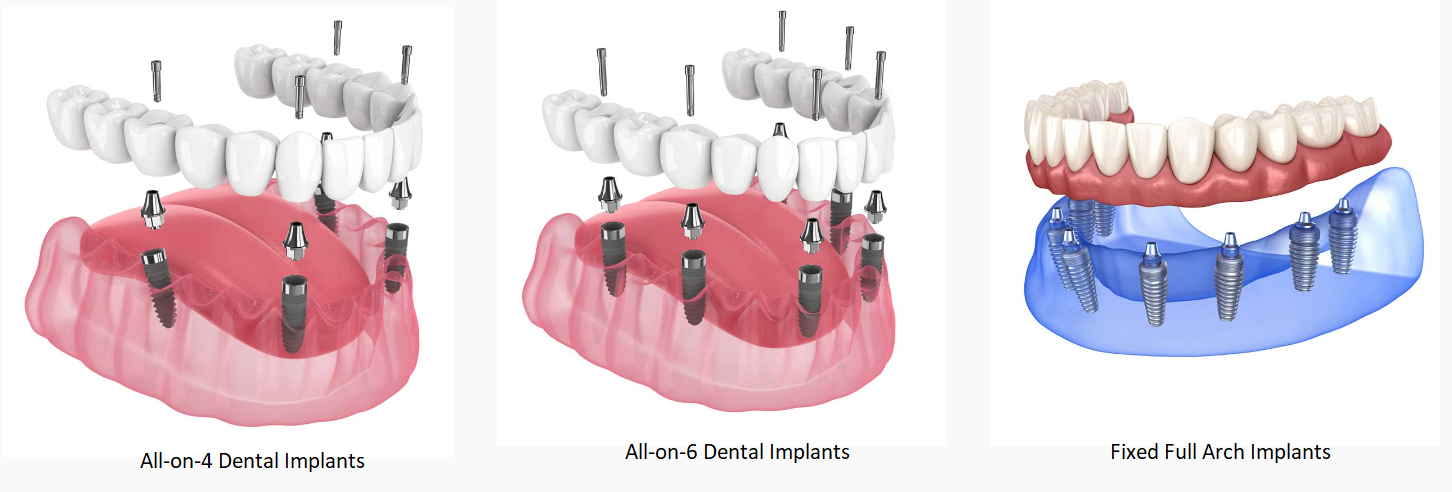
Types of implant supported restorations

The two main types of full-arch restorations in dentistry are fixed implant-supported restorations and removable implant-supported overdentures. Prosthetics can be temporary or permanent.

=== Temporary prosthetics ===
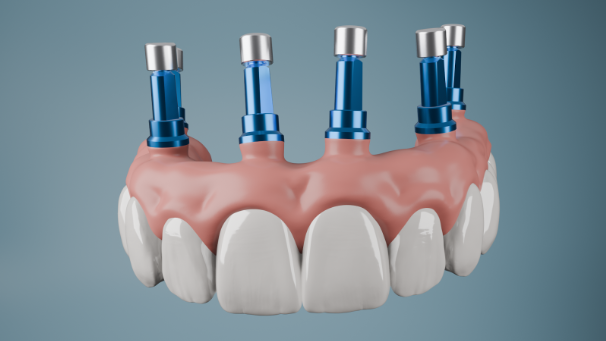
Temporary prosthesis on multi-unit abutments

Temporary prosthetics are essential in implant-supported full-arch restorations.

Temporary prosthetics in full arch restoration refer to provisional dental appliances that are used to replace missing teeth during the healing phase after implant surgery. These temporary prosthetics are designed to provide immediate aesthetics and function while the final permanent prosthesis is being fabricated. They are typically worn for a period of several months until the implants have fully integrated with the jawbone and the final restoration can be placed. Temporary prosthetics help maintain the patient's appearance and ability to eat and speak comfortably during the healing process.

=== Permanent prosthetics ===
Permanent prosthetics in full arch restoration are the final, long-term dental appliances used to replace missing teeth and restore function and aesthetics in patients with extensive tooth loss. These prosthetics are custom-designed and fabricated to fit precisely onto dental implants that have integrated with the jawbone. Permanent prosthetics can include fixed dental bridges, implant-supported dentures, or full-arch implant-supported prostheses. They are typically made from durable materials such as ceramic, zirconia, or metal alloys, and are designed to closely resemble natural teeth in both appearance and function.

==== Dentures that are removable and supported by a bar ====
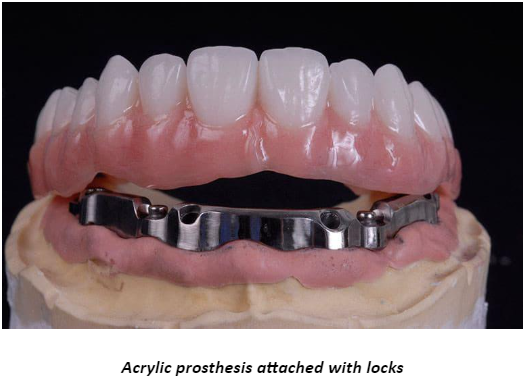
Acrylic prosthesis attached with locks

Approaches for securing a prosthesis onto a bar:

1. Locking mechanism: The dental prosthesis is secured to a metal structure that includes retaining components referred to as "males." These males, integrated into the framework, engage with corresponding "matrices" that snap onto the bar's "locks." The bar is permanently fixed and not intended for removal or conditional removal. Locks vary in design and configuration.
2. Ball Attachments: They consist of a spherical component (the ball) that fits into a corresponding socket or housing on the prosthesis.
3. Locator-Type Cylindrical Connections: type of attachment system featuring individual abutments with cylindrical connections and dedicated interface designs for securing prostheses onto a bar.

The choice of full-arch restoration depends on factors such as the patient's oral health, bone structure, budget, and treatment preferences. A thorough evaluation by a dentist or prosthodontist is necessary to determine the most suitable treatment plan for each individual case.

== Implants and abutments ==
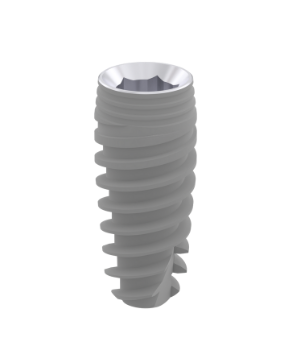
Internal Hex Implants

Implants featuring a prominent threading pattern are especially important when being inserted into a socket that was recently vacated by a extracted tooth. This approach ensures initial stability, relying on 3–4 mm of the implant's tip securely fitting into the bone tissue. The size and length of these implants are chosen according to the specific clinical scenario, taking into account the patient's anatomical characteristics and the state of the bone tissue.

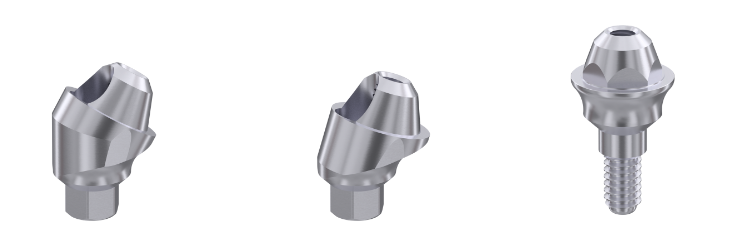
Multi-unit abutments for screw fixation of prosthesis

1. Multi-unit abutments are chosen according to the soft tissue height above the bone during implantation.

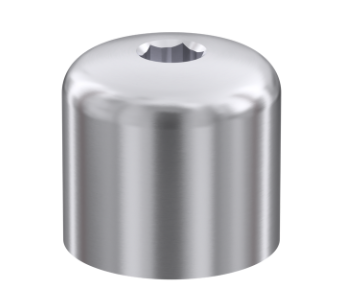
Healing cap for multi unit abutment

1. Healing caps are specifically made for multi-unit abutments. These caps are unique because they are meant to be connected to a multi-unit abutment, which is placed into the implant right after implantation. Afterward, the healing cap is fixed onto the abutment.

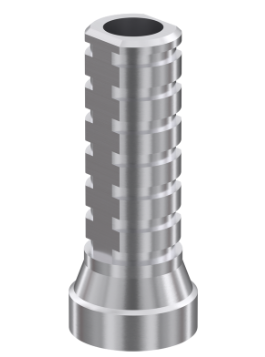
Temporary Sleeve for Multi-Unit Abutment

1. Temporary denture sleeves on multi-unit abutments. During the first few months after implantation, patients receive a lightweight temporary prosthesis aimed at minimizing stress on the implants. These prosthetic devices are anchored using specific sleeves inserted into them, which are then tailored to the required height by grinding at the screw shaft exit points. Afterward, the screw shafts are covered with a composite material.
2. Sleeves designed for multi-unit abutments cater to permanent dentures, offering various modifications to suit different needs. The initial variant is 12 mm long and is altered at the screw shaft exits. The second variant comes with a yellow coating and stands at a height of 4 mm, making it perfect for scenarios where the sleeve is positioned close to the outer edge of the prosthesis.
3. Scan abutments. First, multi-unit abutments are placed to provide support for the prosthesis. Next, scanning caps are mounted onto these abutments, after which the specialist uses an intraoral scanner to capture images. This procedure produces digital files that precisely outline the positions of both implants and abutments, allowing them to be seamlessly integrated with existing CBCT images.
4. Digital analogues. Digital equivalents are utilized for both individual implants and those with multi-unit abutments during the fabrication of physical jaw models. To achieve accurate prosthesis development and fitting, a 3D-printed representation of the patient's jaw is employed. Within this model, replicas of the implants are placed to mimic the exact positions of the real implants within the patient's mouth.

== Stages ==
=== Preparation ===
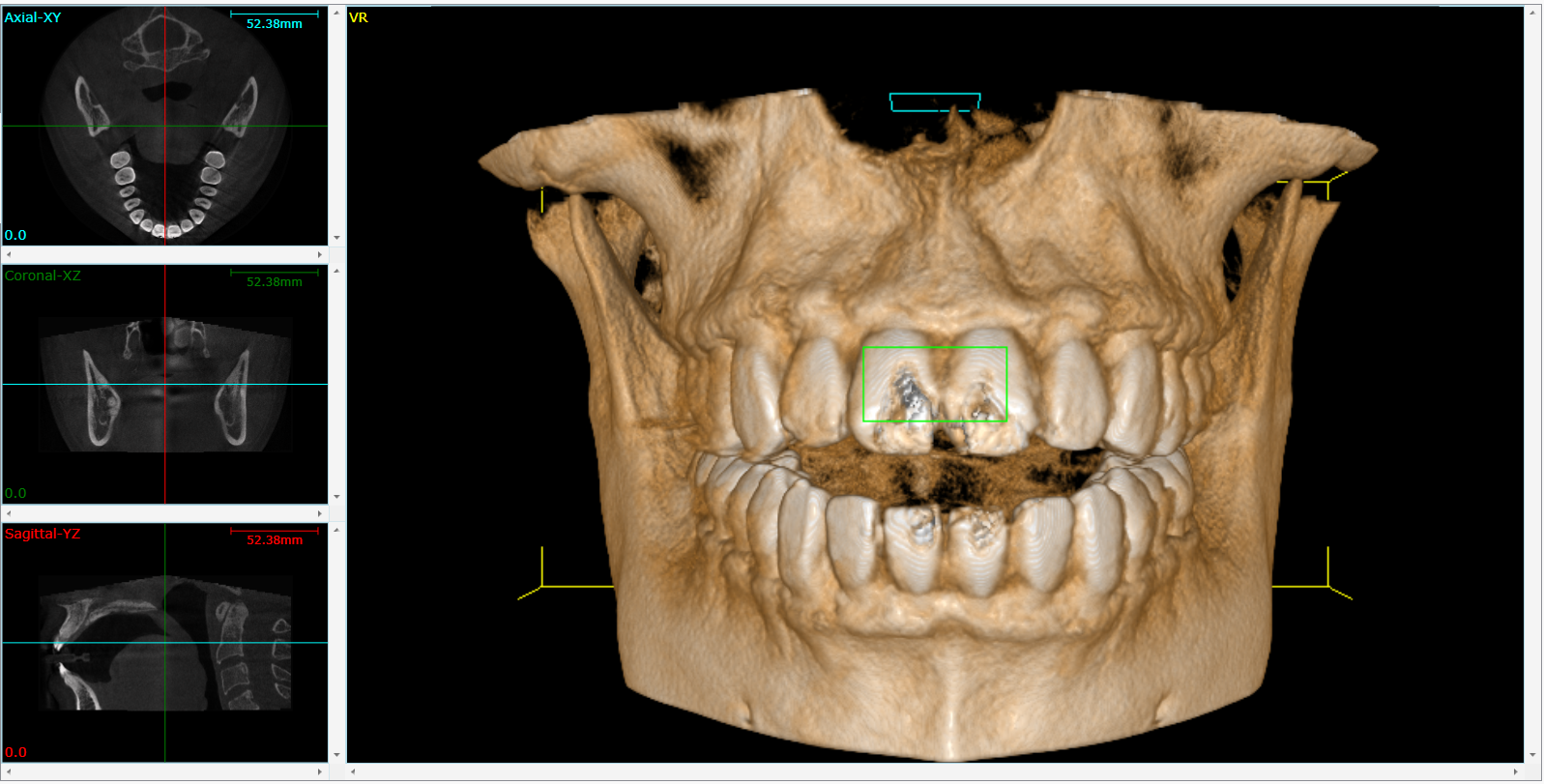
Axial, sagittal and coronal plane of CBCT and 3D reconstruction.

The initial stage commences with the acquisition of 3D representations of the patient's jaw by merging digital data from CBCT scans with optical data gathered from an intraoral scanner. Various software platforms excel in handling this data, spanning from converting CBCT images into 3D files to creating prosthetic models. Leading software choices for these processes include Dental Wings, Shape 3D and Exocad. Additionally, documenting the soft tissue state and existing teeth is crucial, accomplished through photographic records.

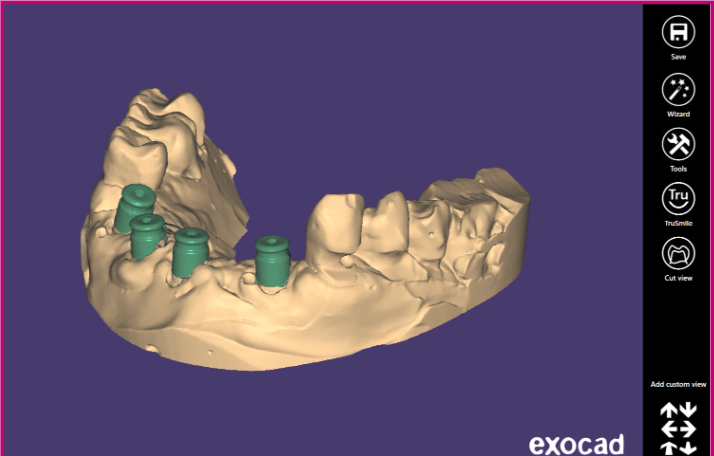
Scan with scan markers

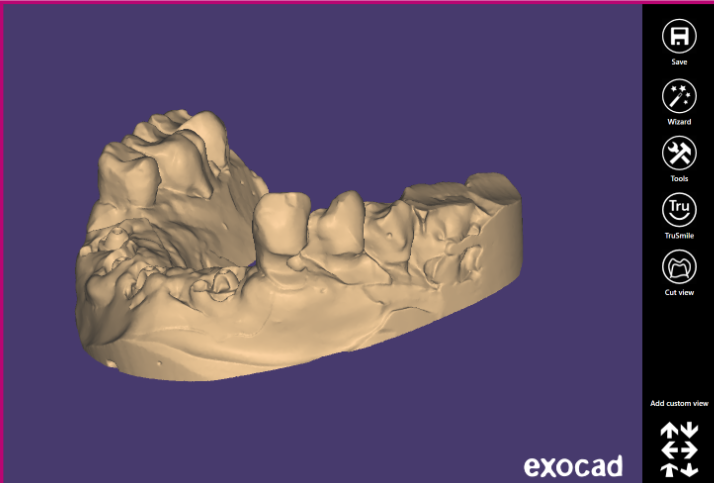
A scan of the gums

Following this, the expert needs to strategize the placement of implants and generate a preliminary model of the dentition. It's vital to position the screw shaft exits on the inner aspect of the prosthesis. Precise digital representations of implants, screws, and abutments are critical at this juncture to guarantee their accurate positioning within the digital jaw model.

Once the suitable implants have been chosen and their positions planned, the next step involves crafting a navigation template, often referred to as a surgical template. The template plays a crucial role in ensuring the precise placement of implants according to the digital blueprint and at the proper angles.

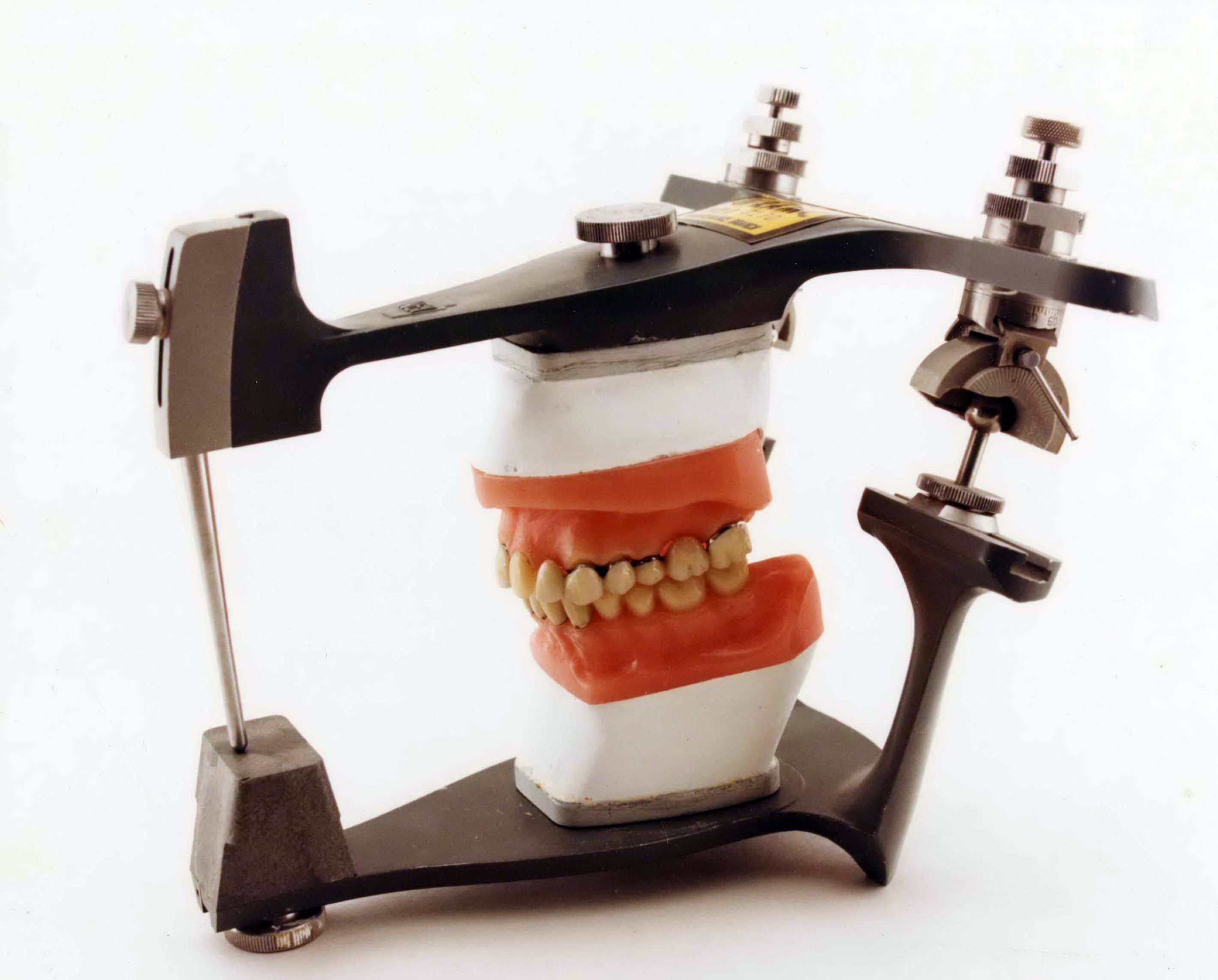
Ney Articulator with Bridge - NCP 3280

The surgical or navigation template, together with the provisional prosthesis, undergoes thorough assessment and any required adjustments using either a plaster model or a 3D-printed representation of the jaw. Both models, encompassing the restorations, need to be validated within an articulator to confirm their precision.

=== Installation ===
The procedure adapts according to the initial clinical state. For patients with a prolonged absence of teeth, the process typically follows a straightforward approach.

1. Creating a navigation template entails making small incisions in the soft tissue at the implant sites instead of pulling back the gums, aiming to maintain gum volume.
2. The predetermined quantity of implants is positioned utilizing the navigation template.
3. Following implant placement, the template is removed.
4. After attaching the provisional prosthesis to multi-unit abutments and sealing the screw shafts with composite material, the postoperative phase commences.
5. In order to fabricate the permanent prosthesis, it is essential to gather up-to-date data utilizing an intraoral scanner. This procedure involves several stages:
- The temporary dental replacement is taken out, and images are taken without the replacement and scanning caps to assess the condition of the soft tissue
- After affixing scanning caps onto the multi-unit abutments, a survey is conducted to assess the angles of both the abutments and the central axes of the screw shafts.
- The gathered data is subsequently converted into 3D files, forming the foundation for creating a permanent prosthesis. This process is supported by a selection of software packages tailored to the preferences of the specialist.
- Elaborate physical replicas of the jaws are meticulously fabricated for the purpose of testing and fitting.
- The entire assembly is thoroughly assessed on a physical articulator. Upon ensuring proper alignment of all elements, the prosthesis is readied for installation. Coloration of the prosthetic gum part is performed, and any necessary color adjustments to the crowns are made using a ceramic layer.
- After the finalization, the fully completed prosthesis is attentively placed onto the patient. Then, the patient attends regular preventive check-ups and maintenance sessions.

== Advantages and disadvantages ==
The benefits include:

- Improved Patient Convenience: Patients receive new teeth immediately following surgery, resulting in shorter recovery times and decreased risk of complications.
- Preservation of Bone: The use of minimal implants and multi-unit abutments reduces the necessity for bone augmentation procedures such as sinus lifts, facilitating efficient and rapid osseointegration.
- Seamless Adaptation: Patients readily adjust to their new prosthesis.

Contraindications:

- Unregulated diabetes mellitus characterized by elevated and fluctuating blood sugar levels.
- Resorption of the alveolar ridge
- Disorders affecting connective tissue.
- Diseases related to the cardiovascular and endocrine systems.

== Risks ==
Rehabilitation treatments involving full arch dental implants may encounter complications and failures. In general, complications may be related to the patient's systemic compromise, increased functional demand, surgical technique, post-operative care, design and type of prosthesis, etc. The overall success rate for dental implants is between 90 and 100% according to the study. Common prosthetic issues following the installation of an implant-supported prosthesis include mucositis, loosening or breakage of the abutment screw or prosthetic parts, and fracture of the acrylic or porcelain structure. Although most complications resolve favorably in follow-up appointments, it is essential to establish an adequate surgical and prosthetic management protocol to achieve predictable and successful long-term results.

== Publications ==
- Sobczak, Barbara; Majewski, Piotr (31 March 2022). "An Integrated Fully Digital Prosthetic Workflow for the Immediate Full-Arch Restoration of Edentulous Patients—A Case Report". International Journal of Environmental Research and Public Health. 19 (7): 4126. doi:10.3390/ijerph19074126. PMC 8998896. PMID 35409808.
- Díez-Suárez, Leandro (27 July 2022). "A Review of Current Concepts in Full Arch Rehabilitation with Dental Implants". Current Concepts in Dental Implantology - from Science to Clinical Research. Dentistry. Vol. 11. doi:10.5772/intechopen.99704. ISBN 978-1-83969-863-7.
- Arun K. Garg, Full-Arch Implant Rehabilitation, 1st Edition ISBN 0867158093
- Ata-Ali, Javier; Flichy-Fernández, Antonio Juan; Alegre-Domingo, Teresa; Ata-Ali, Fadi; Palacio, Jose; Peñarrocha-Diago, Miguel (December 2015). "Clinical, microbiological, and immunological aspects of healthy versus peri-implantitis tissue in full arch reconstruction patients: a prospective cross-sectional study". BMC Oral Health. 15 43. doi:10.1186/s12903-015-0031-9. PMC 4391105. PMID 25888355.
