= Jacques Marescaux =

French doctor (born 1948)

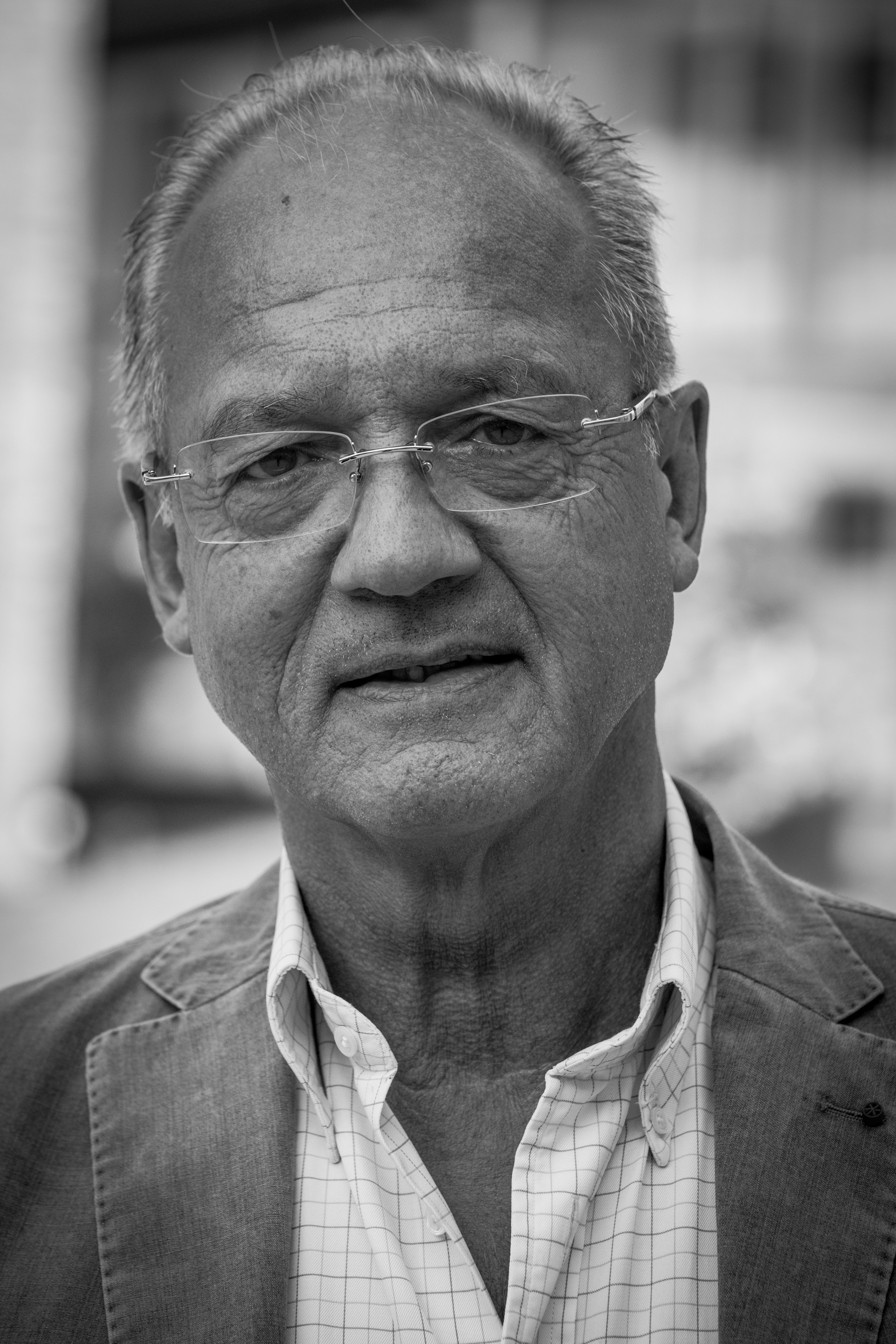
Jacques Marescaux, June 2014.

Jacques Marescaux (born August 8, 1948) is a French doctor. He is the Chairman of digestive and endocrine surgery at the University Hospital, Strasbourg.

== Early life and education ==
Jacques Marescaux was born in 1948, as the eldest in a family of academics and servicemen. His father was a histology Professor at the University of Strasbourg and his grandfather was a major general.

After successfully completing his secondary studies, he registered at the University of Strasbourg School of Medicine. In 1971, he came first at the residency program’s examinations, which allowed him to choose his residency in surgery.

He joined an INSERM (French Health and Medical Research National Institute) team dedicated to digestive pathologies. This scientific cooperation allowed him to be promoted as chief resident in 1975, University Professor for digestive surgery in 1980, and head of the department of University Hospital of Strasbourg in 1989.

He is the founding director of the IRCAD and EITS. On September 7, 2001, he made New York a world first in TeleSurgery, operating in the gallbladder of a patient who was in Strasbourg. This was the Lindbergh Operation. Since 2002, he is the founding member of WeBSurg. In March 2005, he participated with prestigious colleagues - Pierre Chambon, Jean-Marie Lehn, Pascal Neuville and Charles Woler - in the draft pole of "Innovation Therapeutics", in the context of Alsace BioValley.

He is believed to be the first in the world to operate a person without leaving a scar, removing the gallbladder of a patient older than 30 years without making incision of the skin and through a natural orifice.
