= Intraoperative MRI =

- Specialty: Surgery (brain)

Intraoperative magnetic resonance imaging (iMRI) is an operating room configuration that enables surgeons to image the patient via an MRI scanner while the patient is undergoing surgery, particularly brain surgery. iMRI reduces the risk of damaging critical parts of the brain and helps confirm that the surgery was successful or if additional resection is needed before the patient's head is closed and the surgery completed.

== Equipment and operating suite configuration ==
Compared to other imaging types, high-field iMRI requires the additional cost of specialized operating suites, instrumentation and longer anesthesia and operating room time; however, published studies show use of iMRI increases physicians’ ability to detect residual tumor leading toward an improved rate of procedural success.

iMRI is available in a range of strengths. Low-field units, less than 1 Tesla (T), have the advantage of small size, simpler operating theater preparation and portability but are disadvantaged by relatively poor image resolution. Higher field strengths, currently available in 1.5 and 3T options, provide better spatial and contrast resolution enabling surgeons to more accurately evaluate the findings on an image.

High-field iMRI operating suites are configured in one of two ways. Both require that the MRI magnet be stored in an adjacent room. One configuration requires that the patient be moved to the magnet to obtain an image. The second configuration (only offered by IMRIS, Inc.) moves the MRI magnet to the patient via ceiling-mounted rails to obtain the image. The latter approach has the advantage of not moving the patient from the operating theater during the surgery and enhances workflow and safety in terms of airway control, monitoring and head fixation.

== Applications ==
The most prevalent application for iMRI is neurosurgery, especially for the removal of brain tumors. The system is also used for interventional neurovascular procedures.

By providing iMRI during neurosurgery, clinicians can distinguish between tumor tissue and normal tissue, minimize disturbance of healthy tissue or critical areas of the brain, evaluate and confirm their results and make adjustments during a procedure without moving the patient (in the case of the rail-mounted configuration). Published clinical evidence shows the higher percentage of tumor removed the better the outcome. Use of an iMRI suite makes it more likely that surgeons will remove the entire tumor than if surgery is performed in a conventional operating room where iMRI is not used.
