= Journal of Robotic Surgery =

- Discipline: Surgery
- Language: English
- Edited by: David Albala

Publication details
- History: 2007-present
- Publisher: Springer Science+Business Media
- Frequency: Quarterly

Standard abbreviations
- ISO 4: J. Robot. Surg.

Indexing
- ISSN: 1863-2483 (print); 1863-2491 (web)
- OCLC no.: 488593554

Links
- Journal homepage; Online access

The Journal of Robotic Surgery is a peer-reviewed medical journal covering robotic surgery, including surgical simulation and medical imaging techniques. It is the official journal of the Society of Robotic Surgery. The journal was established in 2007 by Vipul Patel and is published by Springer Science+Business Media.

== Abstracting and indexing ==
The journal is abstracted and indexed in Scopus, Inspec, and Academic OneFile.
