= Hôpital civil, Strasbourg =

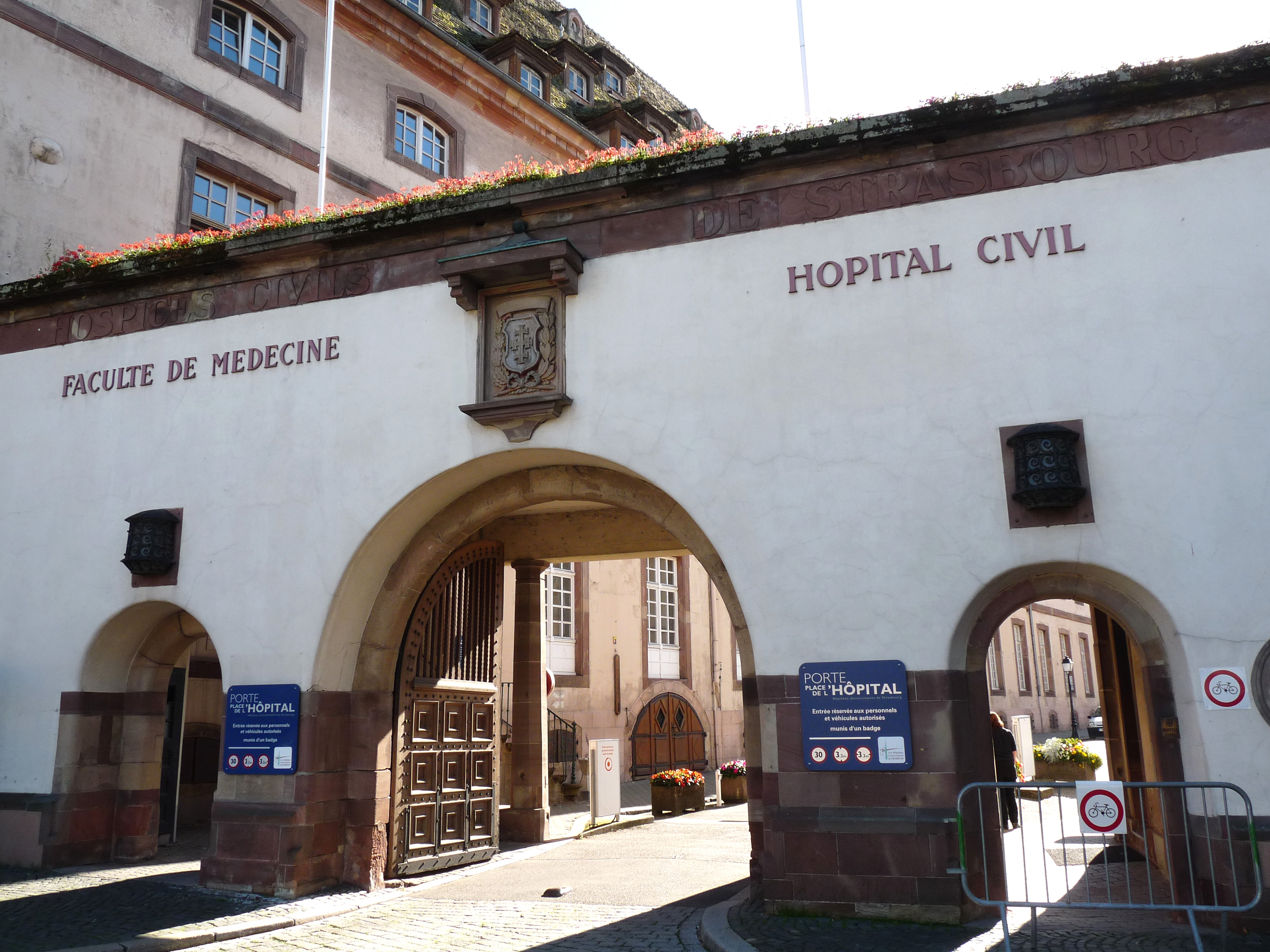
- Entrance from Place de l'Hôpital

Geography
- Location: Strasbourg, Grand Est, France
- Coordinates: 48.576°N 7.745°E

Organisation
- Type: Teaching

History
- Opened: 1119 or 1105

Links
- Website: www.chru-strasbourg.fr
- Lists: Hospitals in France

The Hôpital civil de Strasbourg is one of the oldest medical establishments in France. Today it is a major component of the University Hospitals of Strasbourg, a teaching hospital that is the biggest employer in Alsace, with over 11,000 employees, ranking fourth in France in terms of quality.

== History ==
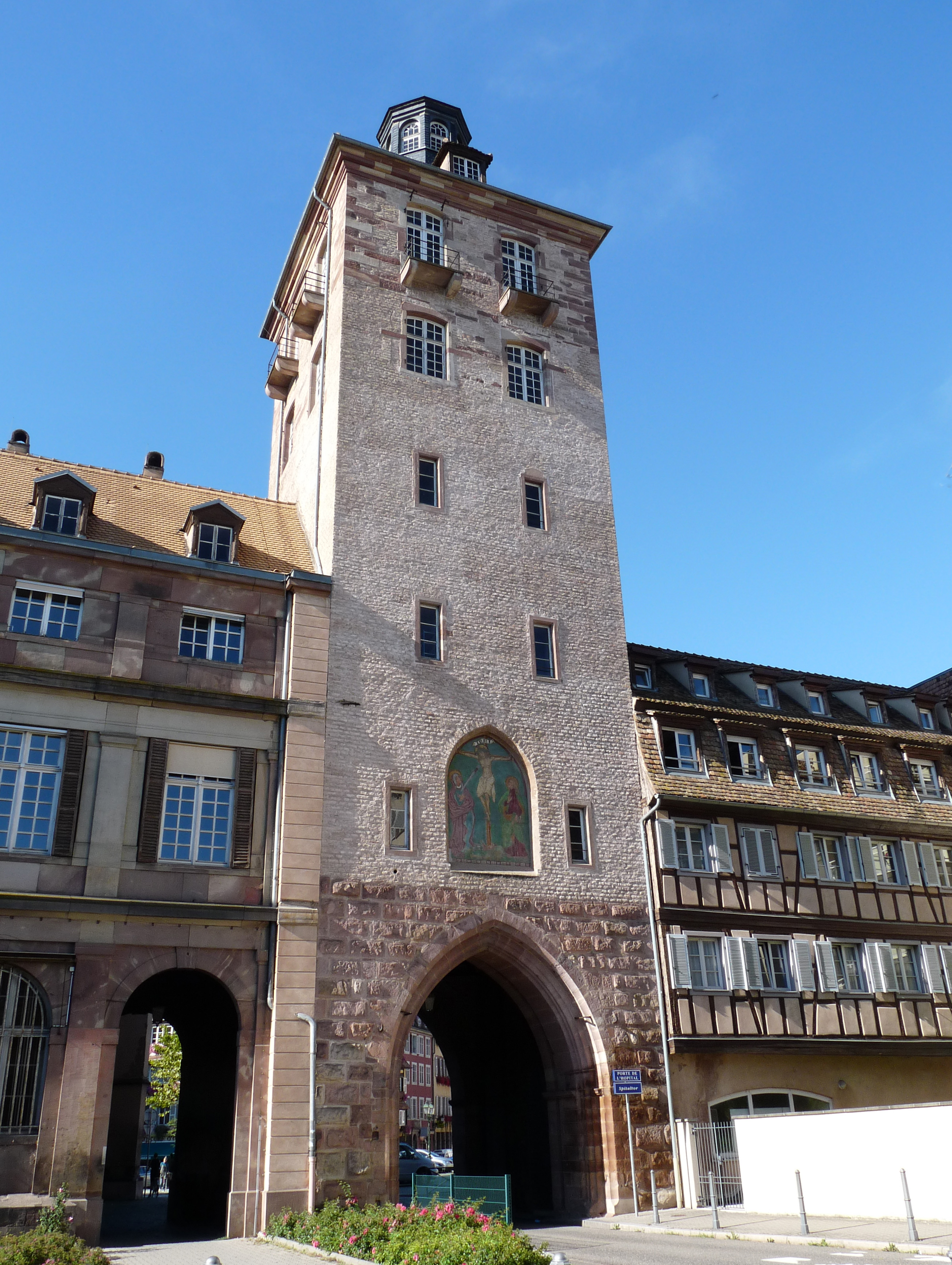
Porte de l'hôpital (1340)

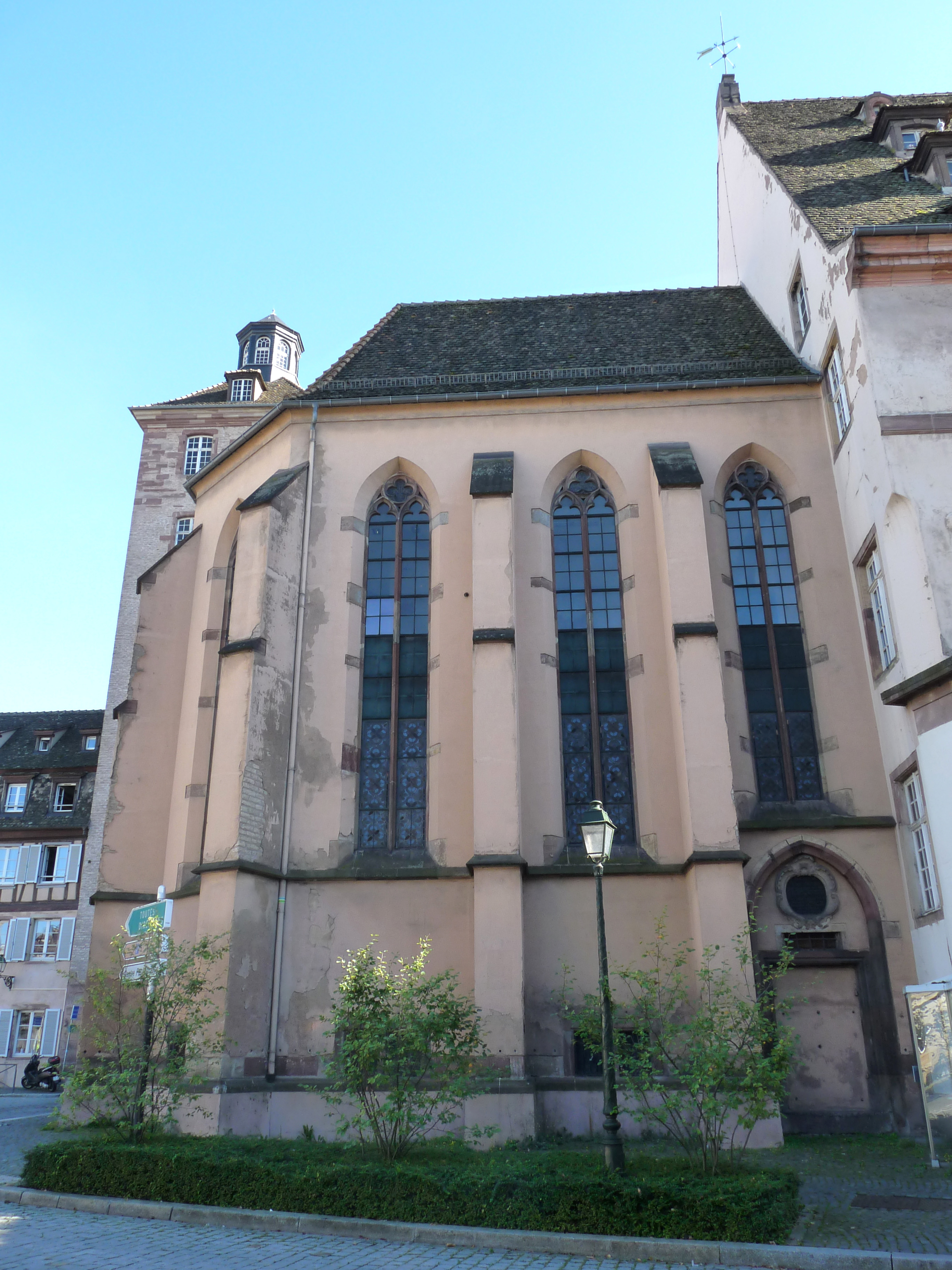
Chapelle Ehrhard (1428)

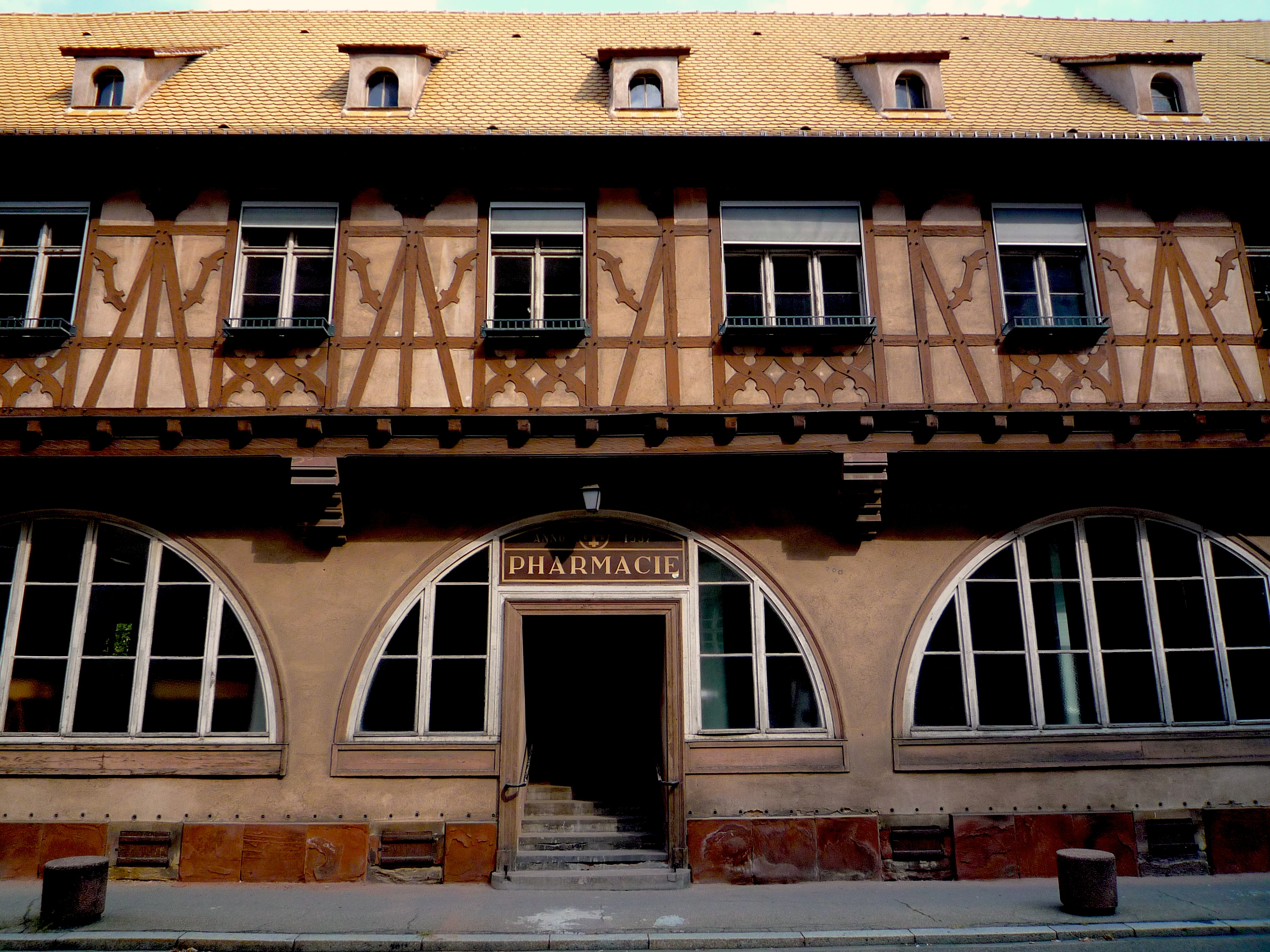
Pharmacy (1537)

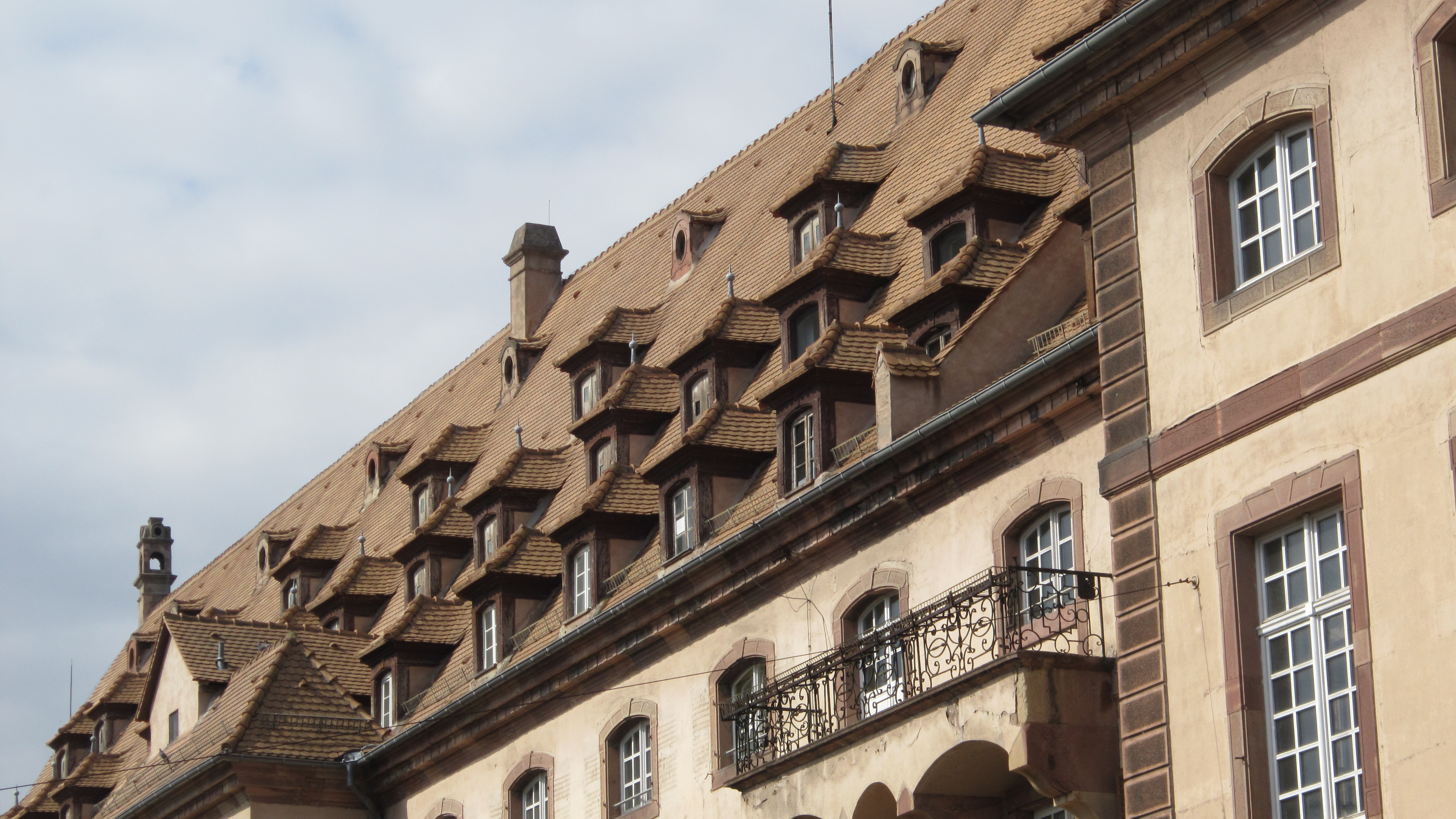
Close-up of main historical building (1725)

=== First hospital ===
According to the 1143 charter of Bishop Burchard von Michelbach, preserved in the municipal archives of the city of Strasbourg, the hospital was founded in the year 1119, although another source refers to a hospital in 1105.

The first building was located close to the cathedral, in the street that now bears its name (rue du vieil hôpital).

A religious brotherhood, probably Augustinian, took care of the sick and destitute. Being a religious establishment, with a mission to care for the needy, the hospital turned nobody away. The Great Interregnum of the Holy Roman Empire, from 1254 to 1273, was a period of great instability in Alsace. The hospital gave asylum to a large influx of refugees from the countryside, where feuding lords burnt a number of villages.

=== Second hospital ===
During the 14th century, the population of Strasbourg was decimated by famine and by the plague. It was decided to move the hospital outside of the city walls. A new hospital was constructed just outside the city gate that became known as the "Porte de l'Hôpital".

The hospital was devastated by fire on 6 November 1716, apparently started by a washerwoman with a candle. It was largely rebuilt between 1717 and 1725.

=== Third hospital ===
Two new buildings were opened in the hospital grounds in 2008, which together are known as the "Nouvel Hôpital civil", covering 90,000 square metres. The inauguration, in the presence of the French Nicolas Sarkozy, took place on 6 January 2009. The new blocks include 715 beds. The equipment includes a Da Vinci robotic surgical system.

== Porte de l'hôpital ==
The Strasbourg city walls of 1340 included seven gates. Of these only one remains, the Porte de l'hôpital or Spitaltor, including a 14th-century external fresco. This city gate is located at the entrance of the old hospital, next to the Erhard Chapel. It was classified a monument historique in 1929.

== Chapelle Erhard ==
The Protestant Chapel at the hospital entrance, dedicated to St Erhard, was built in 1428.

== Wine cellars ==
The wine cellars, which date from 1395, are a tourist attraction in their own right. Over the centuries, many patients paid for their care by leaving parcels of land that have grown to constitute a vast area of vineyards. The 1716 fire that destroyed most of the hospital, spared the wine cellars. The cellars produce some 150,000 bottles a year of Gewürztraminer, Muscat, Riesling and Pinot Gris. The historic cellar is renowned for the quality of its wines but does no advertising and reinvests all its profits in the purchase of medical equipment. In the 18th century, the Hospital of Strasbourg was the largest Domaine in Alsace, making and selling wine as a side business. Patients were given two litres of wine a day. One of the barrels contains what is reputed to be the oldest wine on earth, dating from 1472.

== Notable people ==
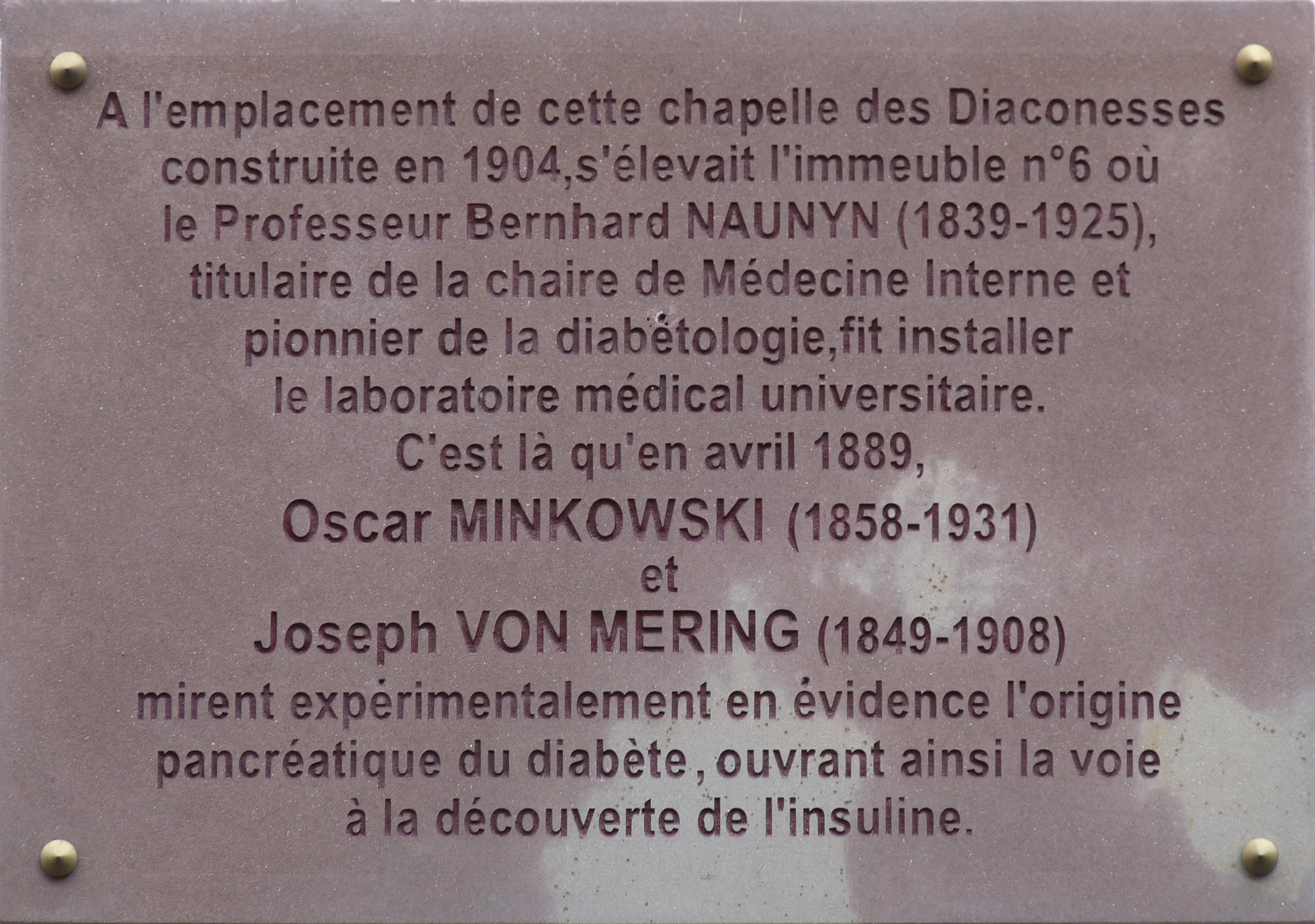
Plaque for Naunyn, Minkowski and von Mering

- Adolph Kussmaul (1822–1902), doctor
- Bernhard Naunyn (1839–1925), internist
- Charles Louis Alphonse Laveran (1845–1922), pioneer of tropical medicine, Nobel Prize in 1907
- Otto Wilhelm Madelung (1846–1926), doctor
- Joseph von Mering (1849–1908), physician
- Albrecht Kossel (1853–1927), doctor, Nobel Prize in 1910
- Paul Ehrlich (1854–1915), doctor, Nobel Prize in 1908
- Oskar Minkowski (1858–1931), doctor
- Otto Loewi (1873–1961), doctor, Nobel Prize in 1936
- René Leriche (1879–1955), surgeon
- Otto Fritz Meyerhof (1884–1951), doctor, Nobel Prize in 1922
- Jacques Marescaux (1948–), head of digestive surgery department

== Literature ==
- Recht, Roland; Foessel, Georges; Klein, Jean-Pierre: Connaître Strasbourg, 1988, ISBN 2-7032-0185-0, pages 187–189
