= Stereotaxy =

Illusion of depth to the sense of touch

Stereotaxy (from stereo meaning "solidity", and tactile meaning "touch") refers to any technique that involves the recording and reproduction of three-dimensional haptic information or creating an illusion of depth to the sense of touch within an otherwise-flat surface. Unlike the current trend in haptic technology to provide haptic perception of simulated, virtual objects within an augmented-reality (that is, within a mostly-realistic) setting, stereohapty, which, when applied as a field of study, is known as stereohaptics or stereotactics, stereotaxy aims to provide an illusion of three-dimensional depth to the sense of touch by the human body. This resembles how stereoscopy, its visual counterpart, is meant to provide a visual illusion of depth to otherwise-flat images (such as 3-D films), a process known as stereopsis.

== See also ==
- Stereotactic surgery
