= IMRIS =

IMRIS, Deerfield Imaging, Inc.
- Company type: Public company
- Industry: Medical equipment
- Founded: 2005
- Successor: Deerfield Imaging
- Headquarters: Chaska, Minnesota, U.S.
- Key people: Marc Buntaine, CEO
- Products: Medical Imaging Equipment
- Website: www.imris.com

IMRIS, founded in 2005, is a global provider of intraoperative imaging solutions.

The company's flagship product is the IMRIS Surgical Theatre. A hybrid operating theatre with intraoperative imaging capabilities, The IMRIS Surgical Theatre incorporates design and technology provided by IMRIS, including the moveable intraoperative MRI, as well as technology from 3rd-party medical device companies. IMRIS designs, creates and supports the IMRIS Surgical Theatre.

== History ==
In 2005, IMRIS evolved from research related to intraoperative imaging conducted through Canada's National Research Council.

In 2011, the company announced it was developing an MRI-compatible image-guided surgical robot specifically designed for minimally invasive neurosurgery. In November 2012, the company announced that it was moving its headquarters to the Minneapolis area. They completed their move in July 2013.

In late May 2015, news broke that IMRIS had "filed for chapter 11 bankruptcy protection with a buyout offer of $9.5 million from secured lender Deerfield Management Co. LP." due to problems competing with larger health care businesses. Chapter 11 proceedings were finalized on August 19, 2015, with Deerfield Imaging agreeing to acquire most of IMRIS' assets.

In 2017, the company marked its second anniversary under new ownership, reporting strong financial growth and strategic investments. With the support of parent company Deerfield Management in August 2015, IMRIS emerged under a new LLC, brand, leadership and focus. Since then, IMRIS achieved record earnings and growth.

In 2021, Marc Buntaine, a seasoned medical device executive, was appointed CEO of IMRIS, Deerfield Imaging.

== See also ==
- Surgical Theatre
- Intraoperative MRI
- Image-guided surgery
- Minimally Invasive Procedures
- Neurosurgery
