= Remote surgery =

Surgery performed in a different location from the patient

Remote surgery (also known as cybersurgery or telesurgery) is the ability for a doctor to perform surgery on a patient even though they are not physically in the same location. It is a form of telepresence. A robot surgical system generally consists of one or more arms (controlled by the surgeon), a master controller (console), and a sensory system giving feedback to the user. Remote surgery combines elements of robotics, telecommunications such as high-speed data connections and elements of management information systems. While the field of robotic surgery is fairly well established, most of these robots are controlled by surgeons at the location of the surgery. Remote surgery is remote work for surgeons, where the physical distance between the surgeon and the patient is less relevant. It promises to allow the expertise of specialized surgeons to be available to patients worldwide, without the need for patients to travel beyond their local hospital.

== Surgical systems ==
Surgical robot systems have been developed from the first functional telesurgery system - ZEUS - to the da Vinci Surgical System, which is currently the only commercially available surgical robotic system. In Israel a company was established by Professor Moshe Schoham, from the faculty of Mechanical Engineering at the Technion. Used mainly for "on-site" surgery, these robots assist the surgeon visually, with better precision and less invasiveness to patients. The Da Vinci Surgical System has also been combined to form a Dual Da Vinci system which allows two surgeons to work together on a patient at the same time. The system gives the surgeons the ability to control different arms, switch command of arms at any point, and communicate through headsets during the operation.

While dedicated hardware was previously used, a team from the University of San Diego demonstrated new possibilities in 2026 by conducting experimental remote surgery using a general-purpose humanoid robot.

== Costs ==
Marketed for $975,000, the ZEUS Robot Surgical System was less expensive than the da Vinci Surgical System, which cost $1 million. The cost of an operation through telesurgery is not precise but must pay for the surgical system, the surgeon, and contribute to paying for a year's worth of ATM technology which runs between $100,000-$200,000.

Using a general-purpose humanoid robot instead of expensive, specialized hardware offers the potential to significantly reduce costs.

== 2025 France–India transcontinental bariatric telesurgery ==
In July 2025, the first transcontinental bariatric surgery was successfully performed between Strasbourg, France, and Indore, India—a distance of over 8,500 kilometres—without any perceptible lag. The live robotic procedure was conducted during the Society of Robotic Surgery (SRS) Annual Meeting, with Dr. Mohit Bhandari operating the indigenously developed SSI Mantra 3 robotic system from IRCAD, Strasbourg. The surgery involved a gastric bypass on a morbidly obese, insulin-dependent diabetic patient at Mohak Bariatric and Robotic Surgery Centre in Indore.

The operation was completed in 48 minutes on a patient with a body mass index (BMI) of 50, who also suffered from sleep apnea and coronary artery disease. The patient was reported to have stood and walked within hours of the procedure.

== The Lindbergh Operation ==
The first true and complete remote surgery was conducted on 7 September 2001 across the Atlantic Ocean, with a French surgeon (Dr. Jacques Marescaux) in New York City performing a cholecystectomy on a 68-year-old female patient 6,230 km away in Strasbourg, France. It was named Operation Lindbergh, after Charles Lindbergh's pioneering transatlantic flight from New York to Paris. France Telecom provided the redundant fiber optic ATM lines to minimize latency and optimize connectivity, and Computer Motion provided a modified Zeus robotic system. After clinical evaluation of the complete solution in July 2001, the human operation was successfully completed on 9/7/2001.

The success and exposure of the procedure led the robotic team to use the same technology within Canada, this time using Bell Canada's public internet between Hamilton, Ontario and North Bay, Ontario (a distance of about 400 kilometers). While operation Lindbergh used the most expensive ATM fiber optics communication to ensure reliability and success of the first telesurgery, the follow on procedures in Canada used standard public internet which was provisioned with QOS using MPLS QOS-MPLS. A series of complex laparoscopic procedures were performed where in this case, the expert clinician would support the surgeon who was less experienced, operating on his patient. This resulted in patient receiving the best care possible while remaining in their hometown, the less experienced surgeon gaining valuable experience, and the expert surgeon providing their expertise without travel. The robotic team's goal was to go from Lindbergh's proof of concept to a real-life solution. This was achieved with over 20 complex laparoscopic operations between Hamilton and North Bay.

== Applications ==
Since Operation Lindbergh, remote surgery has been conducted many times in numerous locations. To date Dr. Anvari, a laparoscopic surgeon in Hamilton, Canada, has conducted numerous remote surgeries on patients in North Bay, a city 400 kilometres from Hamilton. Even though he uses a VPN over a non-dedicated fiberoptic connection that shares bandwidth with regular telecommunications data, Dr. Anvari has not had any connection problems during his procedures.

Rapid development of technology has allowed remote surgery rooms to become highly specialized. At the Advanced Surgical Technology Center at Mt. Sinai Hospital in Toronto, Canada, the surgical room responds to the surgeon's voice commands in order to control a variety of equipment at the surgical site, including the lighting in the operating room, the position of the operating table and the surgical tools themselves. With continuing advances in communication technologies, the availability of greater bandwidth and more powerful computers, the ease and cost-effectiveness of deploying remote surgery units is likely to increase rapidly.

The possibility of being able to project the knowledge and the physical skill of a surgeon over long distances has many attractions. There is considerable research underway in the subject. The armed forces have an obvious interest since the combination of telepresence, teleoperation, and telerobotics can potentially save the lives of battle casualties by providing them with prompt attention in mobile operating theatres.

Another potential advantage of having robots perform surgeries is accuracy. A study conducted at Guy's Hospital in London, England compared the success of kidney surgeries in 304 dummy patients conducted traditionally as well as remotely and found that those conducted using robots were more successful in accurately targeting kidney stones.

In 2015, another test was conducted on the lag time involved in the robotic surgery. A Florida hospital successfully tested lag time created by the Internet for a simulated robotic surgery in Ft. Worth, Texas, more than 1,200 miles away from the surgeon who was at the virtual controls. The team found out that the lag time in robotic surgeries was insignificant. Roger Smith, CTO at the Florida Hospital Nicholson Center said that the team had concluded that telesurgery is something that is possible and generally safe for large areas within the United States.

In 2024, lung tumour surgery conducted over a 5G wireless connection from 5000km away.

== Unassisted robotic surgery ==
As the techniques of expert surgeons are studied and stored in special computer systems, robots might one day be able to perform surgeries with little or no human input. Carlo Pappone, an Italian surgeon, has developed a software program that uses data collected from several surgeons and thousands of operations to perform the surgery without human intervention. This could one day make expensive, complicated surgeries much more widely available, even to patients in regions which have traditionally lacked proper medical facilities.

== Force-feedback and time delay ==
The ability to carry out delicate manipulations relies greatly upon feedback. For example, it is easy to learn how much pressure is required to handle an egg. In robotic surgery, surgeons need to be able to perceive the amount of force being applied without directly touching the surgical tools. Systems known as force-feedback, or haptic technology, have been developed to simulate this. Haptics is the science of touch. Any type of Haptic feedback provides a responsive force in opposition to the touch of the hand. Haptic technology in telesurgery, making a virtual image of a patient or incision, would allow a surgeon to see what they are working on as well as feel it. This technology is designed to give a surgeon the ability to feel tendons and muscles as if it were actually the patient's body. However these systems are very sensitive to time-delays such as those present in the networks used in remote surgery.

== Depth perception ==
Being able to gauge the depth of an incision is crucial. Humans' binocular vision makes this easy in a three-dimensional environment. However, this can be much more difficult when the view is presented on a flat computer screen.

== Possible uses ==
One possible use of remote surgery is the Trauma-Pod project conceived by the US military under the Defense Advanced Research Agency. This system is intended to aid wounded soldiers in the battlefield by making use of the skills of remotely located medical personnel.

Another future possibility could be the use of remote surgery during long space exploration missions.

== Limitations ==
For now, remote surgery is not a widespread technology in part because it does not have sponsorship by the governments. Before its acceptance on a broader scale, many issues will need to be resolved. For example, establishing secure very fast connections between the two sites, establishing clinical protocols, training, and global compatibility of equipment. Another technological limitation is the risk of interference with the communications (hacking). Also, there is still the need for an anesthesiologist and a backup surgeon to be present in case there is a disruption of communications or a malfunction in the robot. Nevertheless, Operation Lindbergh proved that the technology exists today to enable delivery of expert care to remote areas of the globe.

== See also ==
- Waldo (short story) by Robert A. Heinlein.
