= Hospi =

Hospital delivery robot

HOSPI is a hospital delivery robot manufactured by Panasonic. HOSPI service robots were originally developed to be used in healthcare amid Japan's rapidly aging society. It features autonomous navigation capabilities, which allows it navigate using onboard sensors instead of obtrusive rail systems or delineated routes.

== Development ==
The HOSPI robot was launched in 2004. It was built to move autonomously through the pre-installed mapping information within them. It is installed with an on-board sensor and an advanced collision-avoidance system that helps it to move around avoiding obstacles, and stop if a person suddenly runs in front of it. At IREX in 2013, Panasonic introduced a new version of the robot and began to conduct hospital trials of it. Those trials were declared successful and Panasonic began to sell the robots.

In January 2017, the Crowne Plaza ANA Narita hotel began using HOSPI robots primarily for serving drinks and clearing the tables. Panasonic also announced in the same year that there are four hospitals in Japan that use the HOSPI technology. In the same period, Narita International Airport also became the location of the first demonstration experiment of a HOSPI variant designed as an autonomous signage robot. This experiment is designed to evaluate the value of the signage robot in such a setting.

Capabilities

Hospi has security features that prevent theft, its contents from being stolen.

Hospi is able to deliver loads that are timely and loads that humans are incapable of carrying.

Hospi is programmed and equipped with sensors to efficiently and flexibly navigate a hospital layout. Hospi is able to do this also do this all autonomously

Real Implementation

Changi general hospital uses hospi as part of the hospitals’ porter management system

In 2017, Hospi was tested at a hotel call ANA Crowne Plaza Narita hotel and in Narita International Airport.

== See also ==
- Pharmacy automation
- Robotic surgery
- Rehabilitation robotics
- Biorobotics
