= Pyxis Corporation =

Defunct medical technology manufacturer

- Founded: 1987
- Defunct: 1996

Pyxis Corporation was a San Diego company co-founded by Ronald R. Taylor and investor Tim Wollaeger in 1987. The company was the first to develop MedStation products in 1990 and is also a market leader for automated medication management, developing an automated dispensing cabinet under the name Pyxis.

== History ==
Pyxis went public in 1992. The company continued to grow, eventually reaching 1,500 employees, and in 1996, it was bought by Cardinal Health for $867 million in stock.

In 2009 Cardinal Health completed the spin-off of its clinical and medical products businesses based in the previous Pyxis Corporation products into an independent medical technology company named Carefusion, with David Schlotterbeck as CEO. Carefusion continued the development of Pyxis systems.

In October 2014, Becton Dickinson bought Carefusion for a price of $12.2 billion in cash and stock. Since then, BD has been the developer of Carefusion and its Pyxis Systems.

== Automated dispensing cabinet ==
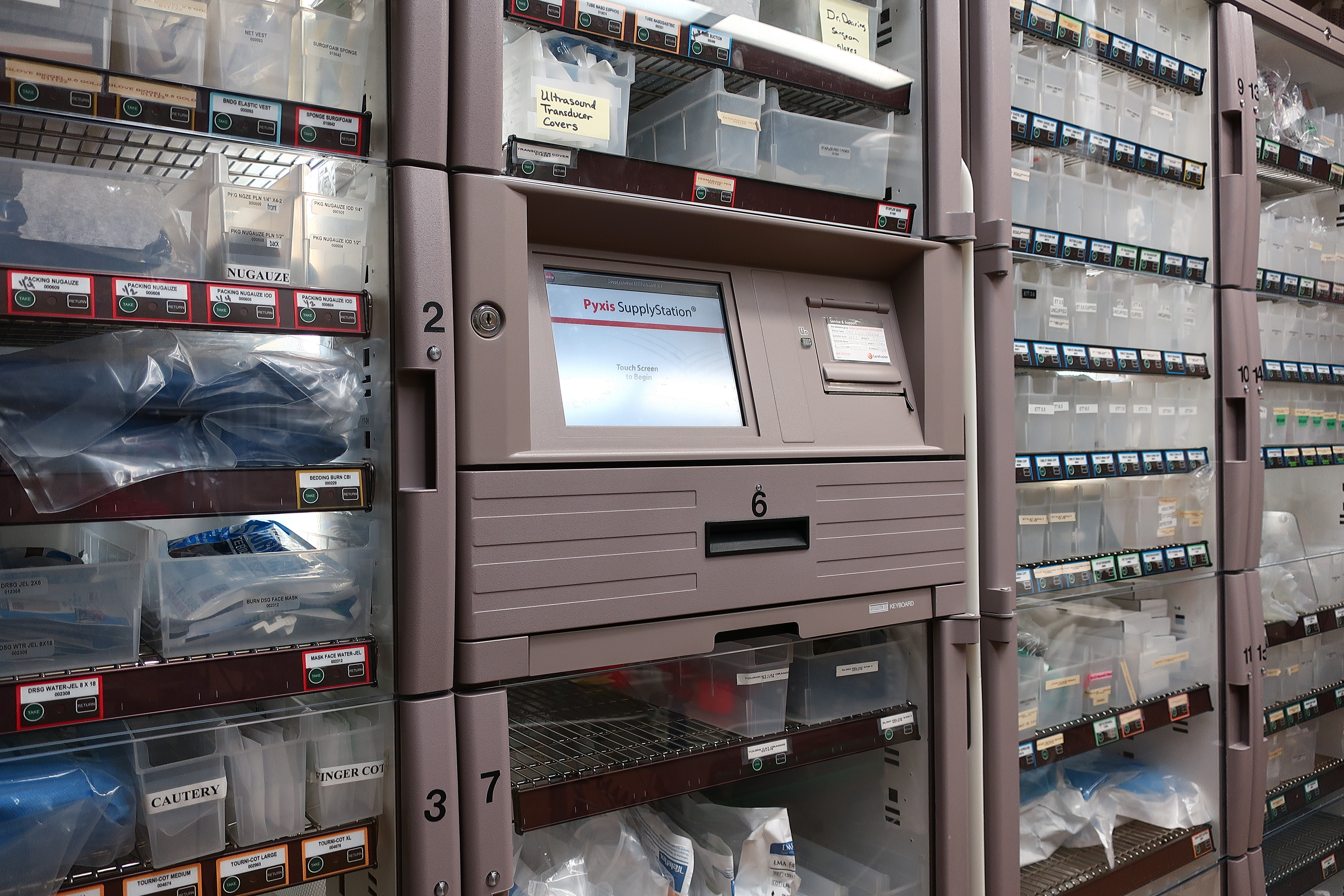
A Pyxis SupplyStation at Campbell County Memorial Hospital in Gillette, Wyoming

The company created an automated dispensing cabinet called MedStation, a system of inventoried and connected cabinets and pharmacy units, allowing a safe delivery and reception from point to point between pharmacies to pharmacies, pharmacies to medication units and medication units to pharmacies. Pyxis products allowed healthcare personnel to avoid the manual recording of drugs dispensed or used by nurses and pharmacies based in a computerized and interconnected infrastructure, and allowed for the development of decentralized medication storages.

== See also ==
- List of unicorn startup companies
