= St. Charles School =

St. Charles School or Saint Charles School or variations may refer to:

in Canada

- St. Charles Elementary School, formerly or also known as École St-Charles School, in Pierrefonds-Roxboro, Montreal, Quebec, a school in the Lester B. Pearson School Board's district

in the United States

- St. Charles School (San Francisco), California, one of San Francisco's Designated Landmarks
- Saint Charles Preparatory School, Columbus, Ohio

== See also ==
- St. Charles College Historic District, Catonsville, Maryland, listed on the National Register of Historic Places
