= CareFusion =

Becton Dickson subsidiary

CareFusion Corporation
- Type: Subsidiary
- Industry: Medical Technology
- Founded: 2009; 17 years ago
- Fate: Acquired by Becton Dickinson in 2015
- Successor: Becton Dickinson
- Headquarters: San Diego, California, U.S.
- Area served: Worldwide
- Products: Medical devices Clinical services
- Website: www.carefusion.com

CareFusion Corporation was a medical company specializing in two areas: reducing medication errors and prevention of health care-associated infections.

== Spinoff ==
CareFusion was created in 2009 as a spinoff of medical technology businesses from Cardinal Health. It began publicly trading on the New York Stock Exchange on September 1, 2009. Cardinal's core business was drug distribution, a low-margin and low-risk, predictable business, with which the higher-margin, higher-risk medical technology businesses were difficult to integrate.

The spin-off was named after Care Fusion, a business Cardinal Health acquired in 2006 that was based in McLean, Virginia, and sold wireless patient identification systems used in hospitals.

It also included Cardinal's automated dispensing cabinet line, which had been acquired when Cardinal bought Pyxis Corporation in 1996 for $920 million. Pyxis had been founded in San Diego by Ronald R. Taylor and investor Tim Wollaeger in 1987 and had around 1,500 employees when it was acquired. Cardinal had acquired Pyxis as part of an earlier strategy to start selling higher-margin products.

CareFusion also included assets acquired by Cardinal in 2004 through the acquisition of another San Diego company, Alaris Medical Systems, in 2004, for $2 billion. Alaris made intravenous drug pumps.

== Subsequent history ==
In May 2010, CareFusion acquired Medegen, Inc. for US$ 225 million in cash. On February 1, 2011, Kieran T. Gallahue was named CareFusion's chairman and CEO. In April 2012, CareFusion sold the Nicolet operating unit to Natus Medical Incorporated for $58 million. On July 7, 2012, CareFusion acquired U.K. Medical Limited, a distributor of medical products to the National Health Service and private health care sector in the United Kingdom. In November 2012, CareFusion acquired Intermed Equipamento Medico Hospitalar Ltda, a privately held respiratory technologies company based in Cotia, Brazil. Intermed designs, manufactures and markets ventilators and respiratory care devices for infant, pediatric and adult patients that are used in hospitals in Brazil, Latin America and Europe.

In 2011, CareFusion acquired Rowa Automatisierungssysteme. In November 2013, CareFusion acquired Vital Signs Inc., a medical device manufacturing business, with the exception of European operations from GE Healthcare. In 2013, CareFusion bought 40% of the Israeli company Caesarea Medical Electronics.

In January 2014, the United States Department of Justice reached a US$40.1 million settlement with CareFusion. The Department of Justice alleged that CareFusion violated the False Claims Act by promoting the sale of its drug ChloraPrep for uses that were not approved by the FDA. ChloraPrep is the commercial name under which CareFusion produced the drug chlorhexidine, used to clean the skin before surgery. In 2017, this case was called into question and came under review by the DOJ because the lead attorney for the DOJ serving as Assistant Attorney General in the case, Jeffery Wertkin, was arrested by the FBI on January 31, 2017 for allegedly attempting to sell a copy of a complaint in a secret whistleblower suit that was under seal.

In October 2014, BD announced its acquisition of CareFusion for $58 USD per share in cash and stock, or a total of $12.2 billion. The acquisition was completed on March 17, 2015.
