= Omnicell =

American healthcare technology company

Omnicell, Inc.
- Type: Public
- Traded as: Nasdaq: OMCL; S&P 600 component
- Industry: Health technology
- Founded: September 1992; 34 years ago
- Founder: Randall Lipps
- Headquarters: Fort Worth, Texas, U.S.
- Key people: Randall Lipps (chairman, president & CEO)
- Revenue: ▲US$1.18 billion (2025)
- Net income: ▼US$2.05 million (2025)
- Number of employees: 3,670 (2024)
- Website: omnicell.com

Omnicell, Inc. is an American multinational healthcare technology company headquartered in Fort Worth, TX. It manufactures automated systems for medication management in hospitals and other healthcare settings, and medication adherence packaging and patient engagement software used by retail pharmacies. Its products are sold under the brand names Omnicell and EnlivenHealth.

== Company history ==
=== 1992–1999 ===
Omnicell Technologies, Inc. was founded in September 1992 by Randall A. Lipps, after being inspired by his observations of nurses' difficulty with locating medical supplies as he was visiting his newborn daughter in the hospital. With the help of graduate students from Stanford University, he developed a system prototype automating inventory management tasks normally performed manually by nurses.

With Lipps as chairman of the company, Omnicell Technologies, Inc. commercially began developing automated supply cabinets in 1993. The cabinets were capable of tracking transaction data, inventory levels, expenses, and patient billing. The company expanded services by developing pharmacy automation systems for dispensing medications in 1996. They expanded their product line in 1999 by acquiring the SureMed line of pharmacy cabinets from Baxter Healthcare Corp.

=== 2000–2020 ===
By the end of the 1990s, the company had installed more than 14,000 automated dispensing cabinets in more than 1,300 healthcare facilities, and sales grew to $50 million. In August 2001, Omnicell filed its IPO at USD $7 per share. That same year, Omnicell Technologies changed its name to Omnicell, Inc.

In 2002 Lipps assumed the role of CEO, replacing Sheldon D. Asher. In 2003, Omnicell acquired BCX Technology, Inc., a maker of wireless, handheld bar-code scanners that could track pharmaceutical dispensation. The company further expanded with more acquisitions. Its purchase of MTS Technologies added multiple-dose medication blister cards used by retail pharmacies to encourage medication adherence. The acquisition of Aesynt Inc. added pharmacy robots for inventory management, specialized IV compounding robots to remove human error, and pharmacy data intelligence software. The acquisition of Ateb, Inc., which provided patient engagement and patient communication systems to retail pharmacies, led to the formation of the EnlivenHealth business segment in 2020.

== Acquisitions and partnerships ==
- 2012 – MTS Medication Technologies, Inc., a global medication adherence packaging systems provider
- 2014 – UK-based SurgiChem Limited, a wholly owned subsidiary of Care Homes (CFG), for £12,000,000 in a cash transaction
- 2015 – Germany-based Mach4 Pharma Systems, a robotic dispensing systems provider
- 2015 – Partnered with Avantec for distribution of Omnicell products in UK
- 2016 – Acquired medication technology company Aesynt Inc. for $275 million, adding central pharmacy dispensing robotics, IV compounding robotics, and pharmacy data analytics to the company’s services
- 2016 – Acquired Ateb, Inc., together with its Canadian affiliate, Ateb Canada Ltd, providers of pharmacy-based patient care solutions and medication synchronization to independent and chain pharmacies
- 2017 – InPharmics, a Mississippi-based technology and services company that provides advanced pharmacy informatics solutions to hospital pharmacies
- 2020 – Acquired the 340B Link business of Pharmaceutical Strategies Group (PSG)
- 2021 – Partnership with Guy's and St Thomas' NHS Foundation Trust, London to develop technology-enabled inventory optimization and intelligence services
