= George S. Barrett =

American businessperson

- Education: Brown University, New York University
- Occupation: Executive Chairman
- Organization: Cardinal Health, Inc.

George S. Barrett is an American business executive in the health care industry. He served as chairman and chief executive officer of Cardinal Health, Inc. from 2009 to 2017. He joined the board of the Columbus Foundation in December 2017.

== Early life and education ==
Born to Lucille and Herbert Barrett, George Barrett was one of five children. He attended Westport, Connecticut's Staples High School. Barrett received his Bachelor of Arts degree from Brown University and his M.B.A. from New York University. He also holds an honorary Doctor of Humane Letters degree from Long Island University's Arnold and Marie Schwartz College of Pharmacy and Health Sciences.

== Career ==
After college, Barrett worked as a teacher in private schools and pursued a music career. He served as president of NMC Laboratories until it was acquired by Alpharma in 1990. Before earning his master's degree, he worked at a small dermatology firm, which he eventually ran. Barrett was president of US Pharmaceuticals from 1994 until 1997. In 1999, he joined Teva Pharmaceutical Industries Ltd. as president of Teva USA. In 2005, he became CEO and president of North America for Teva. In addition, he became Corporate Executive Vice President for Global Pharmaceutical Markets in 2007.

In 2008, Barrett joined Cardinal Health, Inc. as vice chairman and CEO of Healthcare Supply Chain Services. He became the chairman and chief executive officer of the company in 2009. As of September 2016, Barrett is reported to own over 0.5 million of Cardinal Health shares, worth of approximately $42 million.

== Other activities ==
Barrett was named a trustee at The Conference Board, Inc. in 2010. He became an independent director of Eaton Corporation in 2011. He is on the board of trustees of the Healthcare Leadership Council and The Conference Board. He serves on the board of directors for Nationwide Children's Hospital Inc. He is also a member of the President's Leadership Council of Brown University. He is a member of the Business Roundtable, The Business Council, the Columbus Partnership, and Ohio Business Roundtable.

== Personal life ==
Barrett is a musician and performed in October 2014, at Cardinal Health's Retail Business Conference in Washington, D.C., with his band. In 2023, Barrett released an album of original music written and performed by Barrett, entitled "Not Alone." Barrett supports pediatric cancer programs at Nationwide Children's Hospital.
