= Rowa Automatisierungssysteme =

Rowa Automatisierungssysteme GmbH
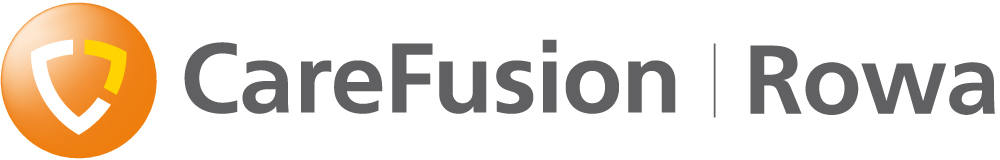
- Company type: Limited liability company (Gesellschaft mit beschränkter Haftung)
- Industry: Machinery, Automation
- Founded: 1996
- Headquarters: Kelberg, Germany
- Key people: Jean-Michel Deckers, Dr. Christian Klas, Dirk Wingenter
- Revenue: approx. 65 million € (2011)
- Number of employees: 350+
- Website: Rowa Automatisierungssysteme

Rowa Automatisierungssysteme GmbH is market leader for automated stock handling in pharmacies and hospitals with its storage and dispensing systems.

Medical supplies are scanned into the system, stored and then dispensed at the pharmacy sales counter using conveyor technology. The company has its headquarters in Kelberg, Eifel and employs over 300 staff. There are subsidiaries in Denmark, Italy, the Netherlands and Sweden. In 2011 turnover reached about 64 Million Euros and the company is one of the top 100 companies in Rheinland-Pfalz in terms of turnover. In 2011, Rowa was integrated in the global medical device company CareFusion, San Diego.

== History ==
Rowa Automatisierungssysteme GmbH was founded in 1996 by Rudolf Wagner and Markus Willems. In 2006, Dirk Wingenter joined the management board and in 2009, Dr Christian Klas became the fourth member of the board. In 2011, Jean-Michel Deckers became a member of the board.

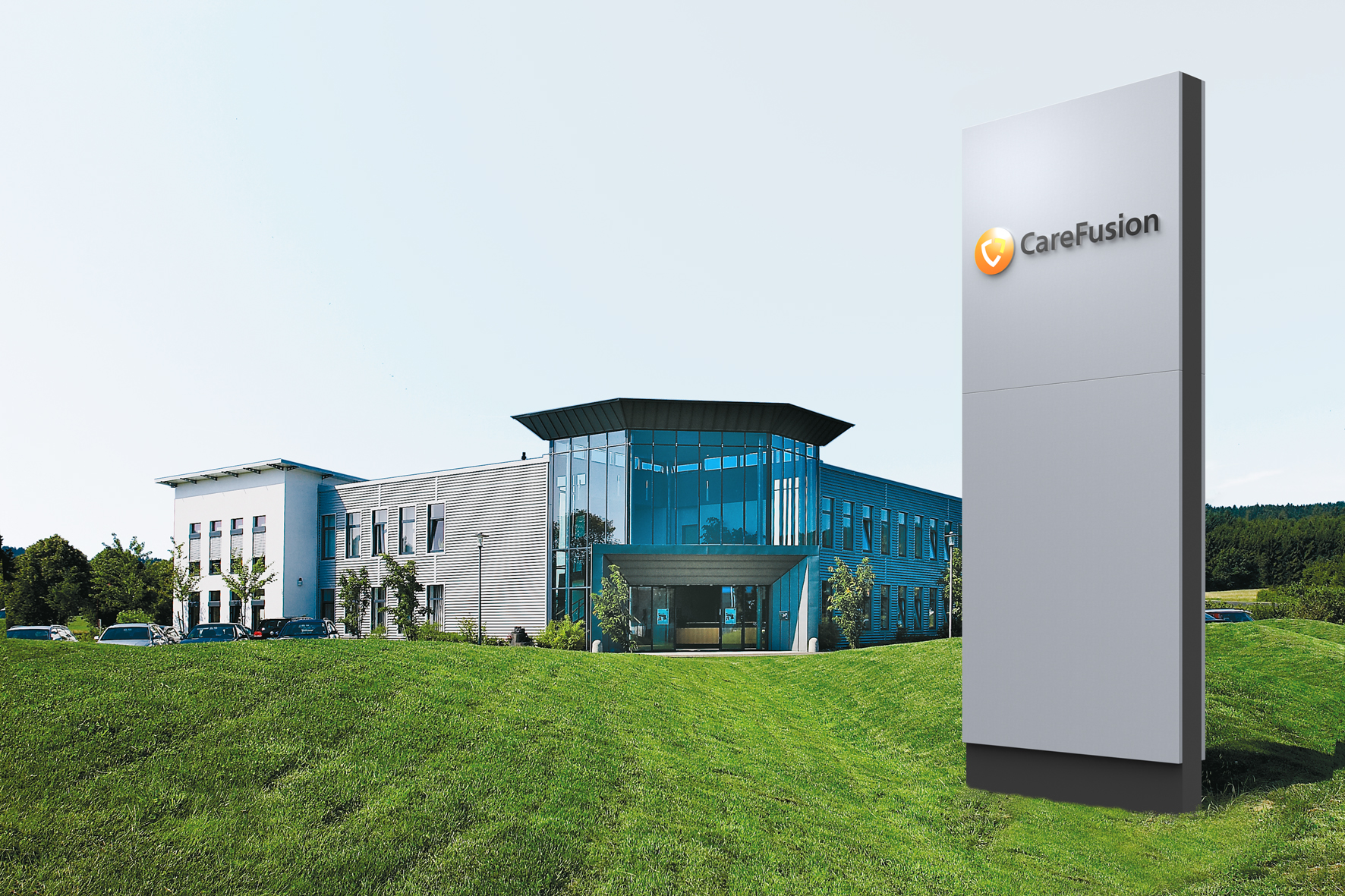
Rowa Automatisierungssysteme GmbH

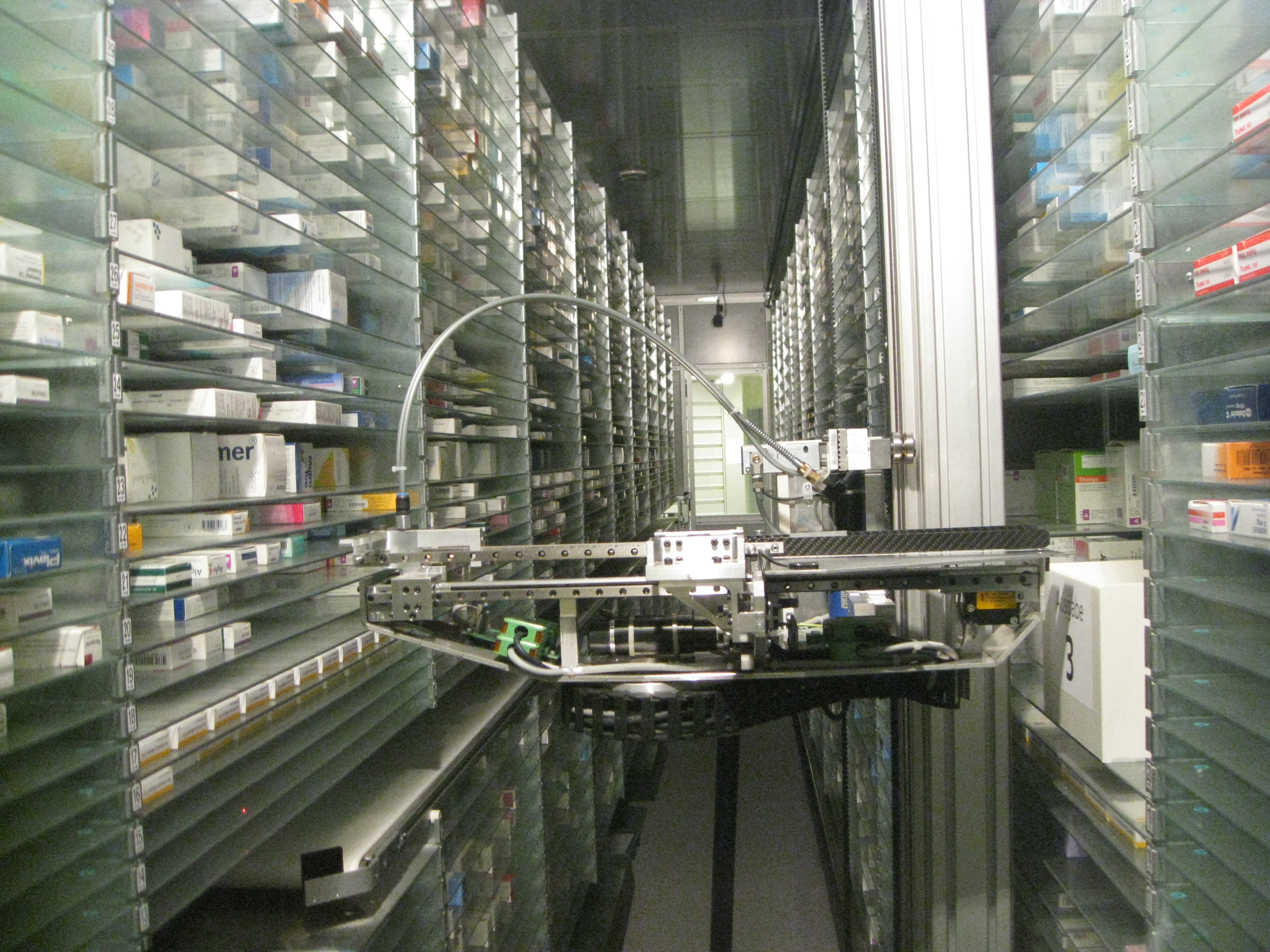
A robot of the company

The original business idea was triggered by a couple of pharmacists. They were keen to restructure workflows effectively in the modern pharmacy. In 1997 the first automated storage and dispensing system was installed in a Dresden pharmacy. Today about 10,000 pharmacies and hospitals all over the world are using Rowa Systems. PharmaXie, presented as the pharmacy of the future at the world fair Expo 2000, was equipped with Rowa storage and dispensing systems.

== Product range ==
Rowa produces and distributes automated stock handling systems for pharmacies. These systems are developed individually for each pharmacy or hospital. Like in a high-bay warehouse, medicaments are stored in random storage according to their size and height. These systems are developed individually for each pharmacy or hospital and store medication supplies as if in a high-bay warehouse without being ordered by size or depth. With high flexibility of the size, the systems can be adapted to the particular requirements of each pharmacy.

Additional options include fully automated storage, or a consultation and dispensing terminal for pharmacies. In the latter case, patients can get advice through a video-conferencing facility and medicine can be dispensed remotely. This system, known as Visavia, is currently being contested in Germany. As a result of a decision (Reference Number 3C 30.09 and 31.09) by the German Federal Administrative Court, it is only partially approved. In other countries this type of terminal is in extensive use.
