= Cardinal Health =

American multinational health care services company

Cardinal Health, Inc.

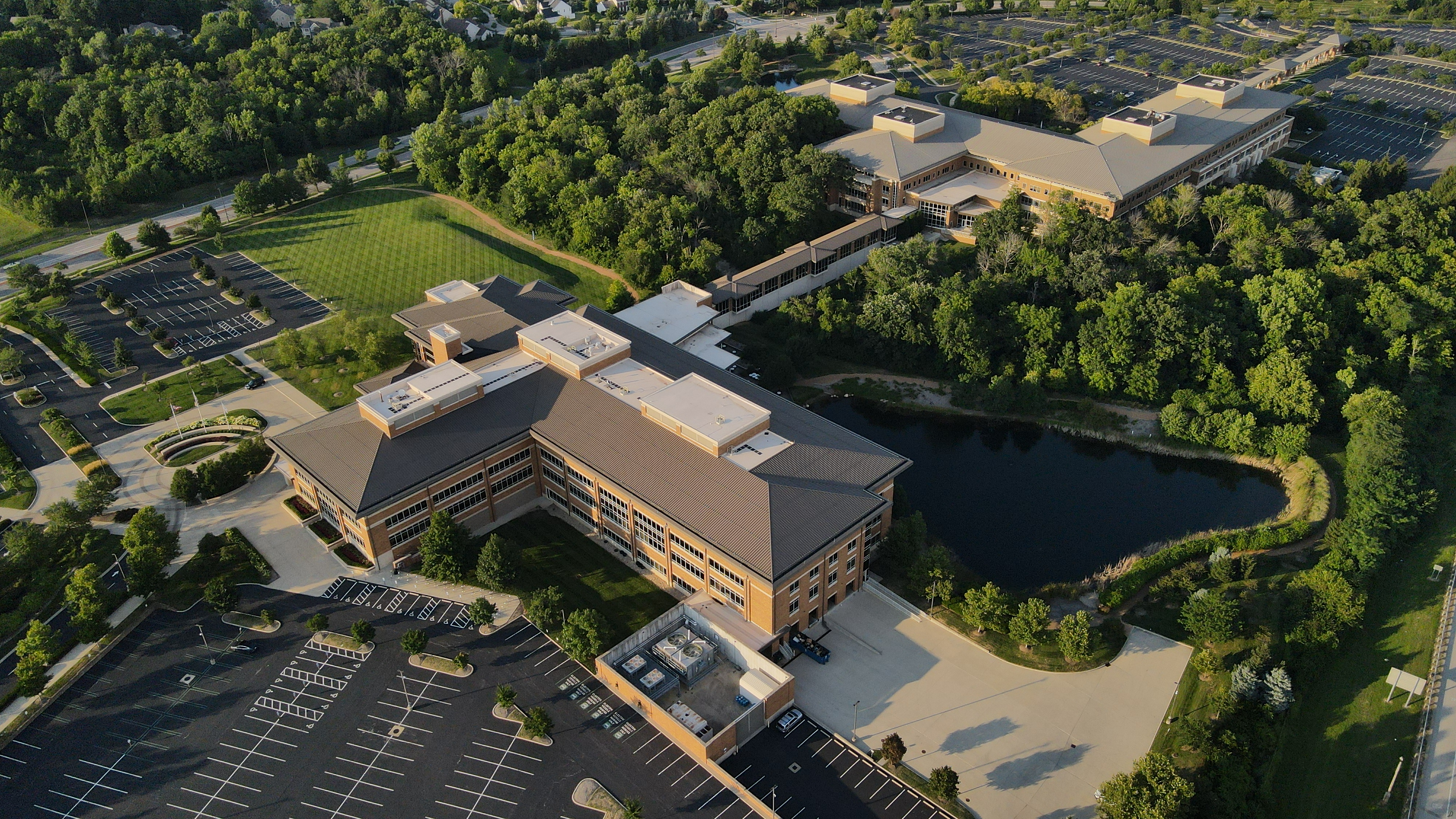
- Headquarters in Dublin, Ohio
- Type: Public
- Traded as: NYSE: CAH; S&P 500 component
- Industry: Health care; Pharmaceutical distribution; Medical devices
- Founded: 1971; 55 years ago
- Founder: Robert D. Walter
- Headquarters: Dublin, Ohio, U.S.
- Area served: Worldwide
- Key people: Jason Hollar (CEO); Deborah Weitzman (CEO, Pharma segment); Stephen Mason (CEO, Medical segment)
- Products: Pharmaceuticals; Medical equipment & supplies; Surgical instruments; Personal protective equipment
- Services: Supply chain management & distribution; Pharmacy management services; Clinical trial & healthcare logistics
- Revenue: ▲US$254.2 billion (2026)
- Operating income: ▲US$2.60 billion (2026)
- Net income: ▲US$1.72 billion (2026)
- Total assets: ▲US$57.30 billion (2026)
- Total equity: ▲US$−2.72 billion (2026)
- Number of employees: ~63,900 (2026)
- Website: www.cardinalhealth.com

Cardinal Health Technologies, LLC doing business as Cardinal Health, is an American multinational health care services company, and the 15th highest revenue generating company in the United States. Headquartered in Dublin, Ohio, the company specializes in the distribution of pharmaceuticals and medical products, serving more than 100,000 locations. The company also manufactures medical and surgical product, including gloves, surgical apparel, and fluid management products. In addition, it operates one of the largest networks of radiopharmacies in the U.S. Cardinal Health provides medical products to over 75 percent of hospitals in the United States.

== History ==
Founded in 1971 as Cardinal Foods by Robert D. Walter, the company was initially a food wholesaler. After acquiring the Bailey Drug Company in 1979, it began whole selling drugs. The company went public on the NASDAQ stock exchange in 1983.

In 1988, Walter sold Cardinal Health's food operations to Roundy's. From 1991 to 1996, the company's sales grew from $1.2 billion to $8.9 billion. The company changed its name to Cardinal Health in 1994, and became the third-largest pharmaceutical wholesaler in the United States.

=== 2000–2019 ===
R. Kerry Clark, a former executive and vice chairman at Procter & Gamble, was appointed president and CEO in April 2006, with Robert D. Walter retaining Chairmanship of the board. In September 2008, the company announced Clark and Walter would retire and George S. Barrett would become the chairman and CEO.

In 2009, Cardinal Health completed the spin-off of its clinical and medical products businesses into an independent medical technology company called CareFusion with David Schlotterbeck as CEO. Cardinal Health is now traded on the NYSE under symbol CAH.

In December 2013, it was announced that Cardinal Health would partner with CVS Caremark to form a generic drug sourcing operation in the United States. The venture was named Red Oak Sourcing and began operations in July 2014.

Between 2014 and 2016, Cardinal, alongside McKesson Corporation, and AmerisourceBergen, spent $13 million lobbying Congress to pass Congressman Tom Marino's "Ensuring Patient Access and Effective Drug Enforcement Act". The bill, which increases the burden of proof enforcers need to show against drug distributors, was signed into law by President Barack Obama in April 2016.

In January 2018, Michael Kaufmann assumed the role of CEO after serving as CFO of the company.

==== Opioid lawsuits ====
In 2019, Cardinal was one of several drug distributors named in lawsuits related to the opioid crisis in the US. In July 2021, Cardinal Health and other pharmaceutical companies agreed to participate in a $26 billion settlement. Cardinal will pay $6.4 billion over 18 years.

In May 2020, Oklahoma Attorney General Mike Hunter sued Cardinal Health in Bryan County District Court, Oklahoma. The lawsuit alleged that the company's actions helped fuel Oklahoma's opioid crisis. The suit was filed along with lawsuits against AmerisourceBergen and McKesson, and the three lawsuits allege that the three companies provided "enough opioids to Bryan County that every adult resident there could have had 144 hydrocodone tablets."

=== 2020–present ===
As of August 2021, it is ranked 14 on the Fortune 500 list with FY2020 annual revenue of $152.9 billion. The firm employs 57,000 people worldwide.

==== Acquisitions ====
In 1995, Medicine Shoppe International, the country's largest franchiser of retail pharmacies, was acquired. The merger represented the first non-distribution acquisition by Cardinal Health.

In 1996, Cardinal Health acquired Pyxis Corporation, a company that developed automated pill dispensers for hospitals, for $867 million.

In 1997, Cardinal Health planned to purchase Bergen Brunswig Corp., to which McKesson Corporation responded with a bid to purchase Amerisource. Instead, Amerisource and Bergen merged into AmerisourceBergen. Later that year, Cardinal Health completed the acquisition of Owen Healthcare, the second-largest provider of pharmacy management services in the U.S. at the time.

In 1999, the firm acquired the Chicago-based medical products manufacturer and distributor, Allegiance Healthcare (formerly a division of Baxter Healthcare). In 2001, the company acquired Bindley Western Industries, a wholesale distributor of pharmaceuticals based in Indianapolis.

In April 2006, Cardinal Health purchased Niagara Falls-based ParMed Pharmaceuticals for $40.1 million. In June 2007, the firm announced the completion of a tender offer for VIASYS Healthcare.

In June 2010, Cardinal Health announced plans to purchase Healthcare Solutions Holding, a specialty pharmaceutical services company, for $517 million. In December 2010, the company acquired Kinray, an independent pharmaceutical wholesaler, increasing Cardinal Health's presence in the independent pharmacy market by 40 percent. From 2010 to 2014, Cardinal Health acquired 18 companies including Yong Yu, a Chinese drug distributor. Cardinal sold Yong Yu in 2017 to Shanghai Pharmaceuticals Holding Co. Ltd. for $1.2 billion.

On March 18, 2013, Cardinal Health acquired the Twinsburg, Ohio-based privately held medical supply distributor AssuraMed, and with it its subsidiaries including Edgepark Medical Supplies, for $2.7 billion. AssuraMed was backed by private equity firms Clayton, Dubilier & Rice and Goldman Sachs Alternatives.

In July 2014, Cardinal Health and CVS formed Red Oak Sourcing, the largest generic drug sourcing operation in the United States. The companies started buying generic drugs around the world to sell in U.S. markets.

In March 2015, Cardinal Health signed an agreement to acquire Johnson & Johnson's Cordis (medical) division, a cardiology and endovascular device manufacturer, for $1.94 billion. The acquisition was completed on October 4, 2015. Cardinal sold the division in August 2021 to Hellman & Friedman, a private equity firm, for $1 billion.

In April 2017, Cardinal Health announced the plan to acquire the patient product portfolio from Medtronic for $6.1 billion. The acquisition was completed on July 30, 2017.

In November 2024, Cardinal Health announced the plan to acquire Advanced Diabetes Supply Group (ADSG), a leading national direct-to-patient provider of diabetes medical supplies, for about $1.1 billion with plans to merge the company into its at-Home Solutions business. The at-Home Solutions business includes Edgepark Medical Supplies of Twinsburg, Ohio and United States Medical Supply (US MED) of Doral, Florida. The acquisition was complete by April 2024.

In August 2025, Cardinal Health announced that it would acquire a 75% stake in Solaris Health, the largest urology management services organization (MSO) in the United States, for $1.9 billion in cash.

In July 2026, Cardinal Health agreed to acquire AdaptHealth's diabetes health business and medical-supply provider Strive Medical in separate transactions worth approximately US$360 million in total. The acquisitions were intended to expand its at-Home Solutions business in diabetes and urological care.

== Controversy ==
=== Role in the Opioid epidemic ===
Multiple legal settlements have demonstrated Cardinal Health's role in the US Opioid epidemic, though the company never admitted wrongdoing:

- December 2016: Cardinal Health settled for $44 million for violations of the Controlled Substances Act brought in allegations from United States Attorneys in districts from Maryland, New York, Florida and Washington.
- July 2021: Cardinal Health agreed to pay $6.4 billion to settle thousands of US lawsuits. They were one of four companies to pay $26 billion, including Johnson & Johnson, AmerisourceBergen and McKesson.
- May 2022: Settled a derivative suit on behalf of shareholders for $124 million.
- August 2024: Settlement with various health plans including insurers and third-party payers for $92.7 million.
- August 2024: Settlement with the City of Baltimore for $152.5 million.

=== Restatements ===
In September 2004, Cardinal Health announced plans to restate past results for fiscal 2001, 2002, 2003, and the first three quarters of 2004 downward, after an accounting review and an ongoing federal investigation. In 2005, in connection with the Audit Committee's conclusions reached in September and October 2004, the company made certain reclassification and restatement adjustments to its fiscal 2004 and prior historical consolidated financial statements. According to The Wall Street Journal, "Analysts called the restatement decision troubling, yet limited in scope."

=== FDA action ===
In August 2006, Cardinal Health ceased production of its Alaris SE infusion pump after approximately 1300 units were seized by the United States Food and Drug Administration (FDA). In February 2007, Cardinal Health signed a consent decree with the FDA which promised procedures to guarantee the safety of the Alaris SE. After FDA inspections, Cardinal Health entered into a further consent agreement with the FDA in 2009.

=== DEA investigation into Oxycodone diversion ===
In 2008, Cardinal Health agreed to pay $34 million in civil penalties to settle DEA allegations that it failed to report suspicious orders of hydrocodone. The fine followed a 10-month DEA suspension of a Lakeland, Florida distribution facility and two others in New Jersey and Washington. On February 2, 2012, the Drug Enforcement Administration again suspended the license of the firm's Lakeland distribution center to distribute controlled substances on charges that it had allowed four Florida pharmacies to purchase excessive amounts of controlled substances, in particular oxycodone.

Cardinal Health obtained a restraining order against the suspension, but the suspension was upheld on February 29 by a Federal district court because the court agreed with the DEA that Cardinal Health's activities represented an "imminent danger to the public." The company stated that it blocked two of the pharmacies, (Brooks Pharmacy in Bonita Springs, Florida, and Gulf Coast Medical in Panama City, Florida), and notified the corporate owners of the two pharmacies that were part of national chains, two CVS stores in Sanford, Florida.

In February 2012, Joseph Rannazzisi, chief of the Drug Enforcement Administration’s Office of Diversion Control, issued immediate suspension orders against Cardinal's supply of oxycodone to suspected pill mills. These orders were filed after Deputy Attorney General James M. Cole met with Rannazzisi to ask if he had met with Cardinal about the investigation. Cole stated that he believed “it made good sense to listen to what Cardinal had to say” regarding the investigation. That year, Cardinal and the DEA reached a settlement that suspended Cardinal's facility in Lakeland, Florida from selling pain killers or other drugs for two years. In 2016, Cardinal was fined $44 million for after the investigation concluded.

In January 2022, Cardinal Health, Johnson & Johnson, McKesson, and AmerisourceBergen agreed to pay $26 billion to settle with all but five of the states suing them. Had the states gone to court, the companies could have faced up to $95 billion in penalties.

== Finances ==
Annual financial statistics are displayed below:

Year	Revenue in million USD	Net income in million USD	Total Assets in million USD	Employees
2005	72,666	4,460	21,838	
2006	79,664	4,814	23,433	
2007	86,755	5,197	23,154	
2008	87,408	3,777	23,448	
2009	95,992	3,748	25,119	29,600
2010	98,503	3,781	19,990	31,200
2011	102,644	4,162	22,846	31,900
2012	107,552	4,541	24,260	32,500
2013	101,093	4,921	25,819	33,600
2014	91,084	5,161	26,033	34,000
2015	102,531	5,712	30,142	34,500
2016	121,546	6,543	34,122	37,300
2017	129,976	6,544	40,112	40,400
2018	136,809	7,181	39,951	50,200
2019	145,534	1,363	40,963	31,000
2020	152,922	-3,696	40,766	30,000
2021	162,467	611	44,453	47,300
2022	181,326	-938	43,878	46,500
2023	204,979	330	43,349	48,000
2024	226,827	852	45,121	48,900
2025	222,578	1,561	53,122	57,700

== Cardinal Health Foundation ==
The Cardinal Health Foundation is the charitable arm of Cardinal Health. The company makes annual product donations of over $9 million through international relief organizations and provides up to $1,000 in matching funds for every Cardinal Health employee that makes a charitable donation. In 2008, the foundation established its E3 Grant Program. Over the past seven years, the Foundation has invested more than $7.15 million in funding to 241 hospitals, health systems or other health-related organizations.

Cardinal Health also supports organizations such as Ronald McDonald House Charities, and was named Benefactor of the Year at the 2011 Corporate Caring Awards. In 2015, the foundation contributed $3 million to the Solutions for Patient Safety project, which has raised over $11 million nationally for efforts to improve safety initiatives in children's hospitals.
