= Robert D. Walter =

American businessman (born 1944)

Robert D. Walter (born 1944) is an American businessman best known for his role in the creation of Cardinal Health.

== Early life ==
Walter graduated from St. Charles Preparatory School in Columbus, Ohio, and received a B.A. degree from Ohio University in 1967. Walter later attended Harvard Business School, where he received an MBA.

== Career ==
In 1971, he founded Cardinal Foods after purchasing Monarch Foods, a small Ohio food wholesaler. In less than a decade his company became a regional food distributor. In 1979, the company acquired Bailey Drug Company and began wholesaling drugs. He renamed the company Cardinal Health. By 1983, the company went public and, under Walter's direction, achieved $1 billion in revenue in 1991.

In subsequent years, the company experienced extraordinary growth, "one of a handful of large U.S. companies that had achieved earnings-per-share growth in excess of 20 percent for 15 years straight." Cardinal Health is now a Fortune 100 company and one of the largest distributors of pharmaceuticals, health & beauty products, and hospital supplies in the United States. In 2007, he was #14 on Fortune magazine's list of the 25 top-paid male executives, with total compensation of $42.7 million the previous year. He retired from Cardinal Health at the end of the 2008 fiscal year.

In 2016, after serving on the board since 2006, he was named non-executive chairman of Louisville based Yum! Brands, the parent company of KFC, Pizza Hut and Taco Bell. Walter previously served as a director of American Express, Nordstrom, CBS, Viacom and Westinghouse.

== Personal life ==
He is married to Margaret "Peggy" Walter, who also attended Ohio University. The Walters have given support to the Ohio University community including Margaret Walter Hall, and to the Columbus Museum of Art, where they donated $10,000,000, the largest gift in the Museum’s history, in 2015. Walter resides in Columbus, Ohio; Boca Raton, Florida; and Park City, Utah.
