= Saint Charles Preparatory School =

- Collegium Sancti Caroli Borromeo

Location
- 2010 East Broad Street; Columbus, (Franklin County), Ohio; 43209-1665; United States; 39.969231°N 82.947403°W

Information
- School type: Private
- Motto: Building Better Men
- Religious affiliation: Roman Catholic
- Patron saint: Saint Charles Borromeo
- Established: 1923
- Founder: Bishop James J. Hartley
- Oversight: Roman Catholic Diocese of Columbus
- Superintendent: Adam J. Dufault
- CEEB code: 361595
- Principal: Richard Ey
- Teaching staff: 43.1 (on an FTE basis)
- Grades: 9–12
- Gender: Male
- Enrollment: 505 (2023–24)
- Campus: Urban
- Campus size: 26 Acres (West included)
- Colors: Red and White
- Slogan: The Distinctive Leader in Catholic Education
- Athletics conference: Central Catholic League
- Sports: Baseball, Basketball, Bowling, Cross Country, Football, Golf, Hockey, Lacrosse, Soccer, Swimming, Tennis, Track and Field, Volleyball, Water Polo, and Wrestling
- Mascot: Cardinal
- Nickname: Cardinals; Carolians
- Team name: St. Charles Cardinals
- Newspaper: The Carolian
- Yearbook: The Spectrum
- Tuition: $17,550 (as of the 2026-2027 school year)
- Graduates: 7060+
- Alumni: Robert Nugent Lynch, Robert D. Walter
- Website: www.stcharlesprep.org

Saint Charles Preparatory School is a four-year Catholic college preparatory school in Columbus, Ohio, US. It was founded in 1923 by the fourth bishop of Columbus, James J. Hartley, as a Roman Catholic college and high school seminary. Today, it is an all-male high school serving the Catholic Diocese of Columbus.

The school's patron is Saint Charles Borromeo, and its motto is Building Better Men. The previous motto, Euntes Ergo Docete Omnes Gentes, was a quote from the Gospel of Matthew (28:19) in the Latin Vulgate: "Going out, therefore, teach all nations." It was replaced with the current motto in 2023 to celebrate the school's 100th anniversary. The original nickname of Saint Charles students is "Carolians", derived from the Latin word "Carolus," which means "Charles." In 1947, the students also began to refer to themselves as "Cardinals." The Saint Charles sports mascot is Charlie the Cardinal.

== Campuses and founding ==
The school consists of two campuses. The oldest campus is Main Campus, which contains the main academic building, gymnasium, theater, and natatorium. The newest campus is West Campus, which contains the athletic facility, track, and mentoring center. The school was founded in 1923 by Bishop James J. Hartley as a high school and college seminary for the education of Catholic priests for the service of the Diocese of Columbus. The first classes, consisting of 27 boys, were held at Sacred Heart School, an all-girls Catholic school, while the main school building was being built from 1923 to 1925.

=== Main Campus ===
On November 4, 1923, Bishop Hartley purchased the original 20-acre site, with ground being broken for the main building in July 2, 1924. The cornerstone was laid on September 8 that same year, although it was later covered up. Classes began in the new building on September 14, 1925, although the complete interior of the school wasn't finished until late October 1925. The school was formally dedicated on November 4, 1925. In 1931, the gymnasium and the Our Lady Lourdes Grotto were completed, and in 1941 the theater building on the west side of campus was completed. Major renovations were made to the gym in 1951 to more than double the capacity. A Gaelic-style chapel (called the "Lower Chapel") was added on to the east side of the school in 1937. Bishop Hartley dedicated the chapel to Mother of Mercy. A Milwaukee art company beautified the chapel with artwork in 1952. A natatorium was built next to the multipurpose room in 1990. In 1999, the Jack Ryan Training and Fitness Facility was built adjoining to the gym.

Construction on the US$5.5 million Robert C. Walter Student Commons and the Student Services and Fine Arts Center, the largest addition to Saint Charles in its history, began in June 2005. The approximately 27,000-square-foot (2,500 m^{2}) addition, which replaced the courtyard behind the school, was ready for graduation at the end of the following school year; however, it was not available for full use until the 2006–2007 school year. The addition houses the 15,000-square-foot (1,400 m^{2}) Robert C. Walter Student Commons Area, which serves as a new cafeteria and provides ample seating space for school and community functions. The Walter Student Commons is named in memory of Robert C. Walter, father of 1963 graduate Robert D. "Bob" Walter, honorary chairman and lead contributor to the current capital campaign being conducted to finance the new addition. Bob Walter and his '63 classmate, architect Robert Corna of Cleveland, initiated the concept for the Commons nearly two years ago. Corna was the architect on the project, and based his designs off of a similar plan for Saint Ignatius High School in Cleveland, also an all-male school. On the columns supporting the roof are glass panes, which bear the names of all of the alumni of the school, written with laser. Behind the Robert C. Walter Student Commons Area is the 12,000-square-foot (1,100 m^{2}) Student Services & Fine Arts Center. The ground floor anchors the north end of the atrium, and houses a new kitchen, sponsored by Donatos Pizza, and restrooms. The second floor houses offices for the guidance and counseling programs, campus ministry, and the school nurse. On the third floor is an extensive art room and gallery, with a kiln and mud rooms; and a music and choir room, with instrument storage and practice rooms; as well as offices for the respective instructors. The second and third floor connect to the original building at its rear stairwell, and to the Robert C. Walter Student Commons Area by a staircase.

On November 1, 2018, Saint Charles announced the beginning of funding to an addition to main campus. The addition, funded $20 million, took the place of the former gymnasium and multi-purpose room and add additional classrooms, laboratories, and a new gymnasium. It attached a hallway that connects the new addition to the main. On November 4, 2021, the school broke ground for its 11.5 million dollar Convocation Center named after its alumni Frank E. Murphy (who graduated in 1954). The project was finished in 2023, not only building the new Convocation Center, but also enhancing the Our Lady of Lourdes Grotto, and creating a new central campus plaza.

After beginning in 2023, construction on the Brotherhood Center finished in 2025. The Brotherhood Center repurposed the school's former gymnasium into a multifaceted area with classrooms, offices, a library, and a larger new space designed to help students with their academics.

=== West Campus ===
For the first time in its 89-year history, the school expanded its current Broad Street campus footprint. The centerpiece of this project is the newly purchased property which formerly housed the Dealers Lumber Company and came up for sale in the summer of 2010. St. Charles moved quickly to acquire the 6.2-acre site and closed on the purchase in December. The Robert D. Walter West Campus includes the Savko Athletic Complex, comprising a six-lane running track, the artificial-turf Dominic and Kathleen Cavello Field and parking; a 13,000-square-foot training and fitness facility (weight room and 30 yard turf field for speed and agility); and the Horvath Parking Lot. A pedestrian bridge that spans Alum Creek helps connect it with the main campus at 2010 E. Broad St. The full project, paid for through fundraisers, private donations and in-kind gifts, cost about $5.1 million.

In 2018, Saint Charles unveiled the new Robotics and Mentoring Center (even further west from Main Campus than West Campus, thus gaining the colloquial "West West Campus" or "West-er Campus"). The new center costs $2 million and is 14,000-square-feet. Along with being able to support the Robotics Team, the Chess Team, My Brother's Keeper (MBK) mentoring programs, the new building has a recreational area for indoor sports, including an indoor basketball court and a state-of-the-art golf simulator. The new Mentoring Center is connected to West Campus via a sidewalk along Long Street. The building also includes many state-of-the-art driving simulators in collaboration with The Maria Tiberi Foundation, which was created in 2013, after 21-year-old Maria Tiberi was killed in a car accident with a distracted driver. The Foundation is dedicated to spreading awareness about the dangers of distracted driving.

== Academics ==
St. Charles graduation requirements include: 4 years of religion class, English, foreign language (1 year of Latin required (Note: In the past, dating to when St. Charles was a seminary, four years of Latin were required. This was eventually reduced to two years, and, in the 2020s, to the current one year requirement.)), mathematics, and science; 3 years of social studies; and 1 year of fine arts, health, physical education. Some of the AP classes that are offered to juniors and seniors are AP Latin, Biology, Physics, Chemistry, English, Calculus, US History, and World History. For the 2019–2020 year, Saint Charles will add Computer Science Principles and Government.

In 2005, the State of Ohio implemented the new Ohio Graduation Test (OGT) and Saint Charles Preparatory was one of three schools in Central Ohio to have every sophomore pass every section. (The statewide public school pass rate was 64%.)

== Theatre ==
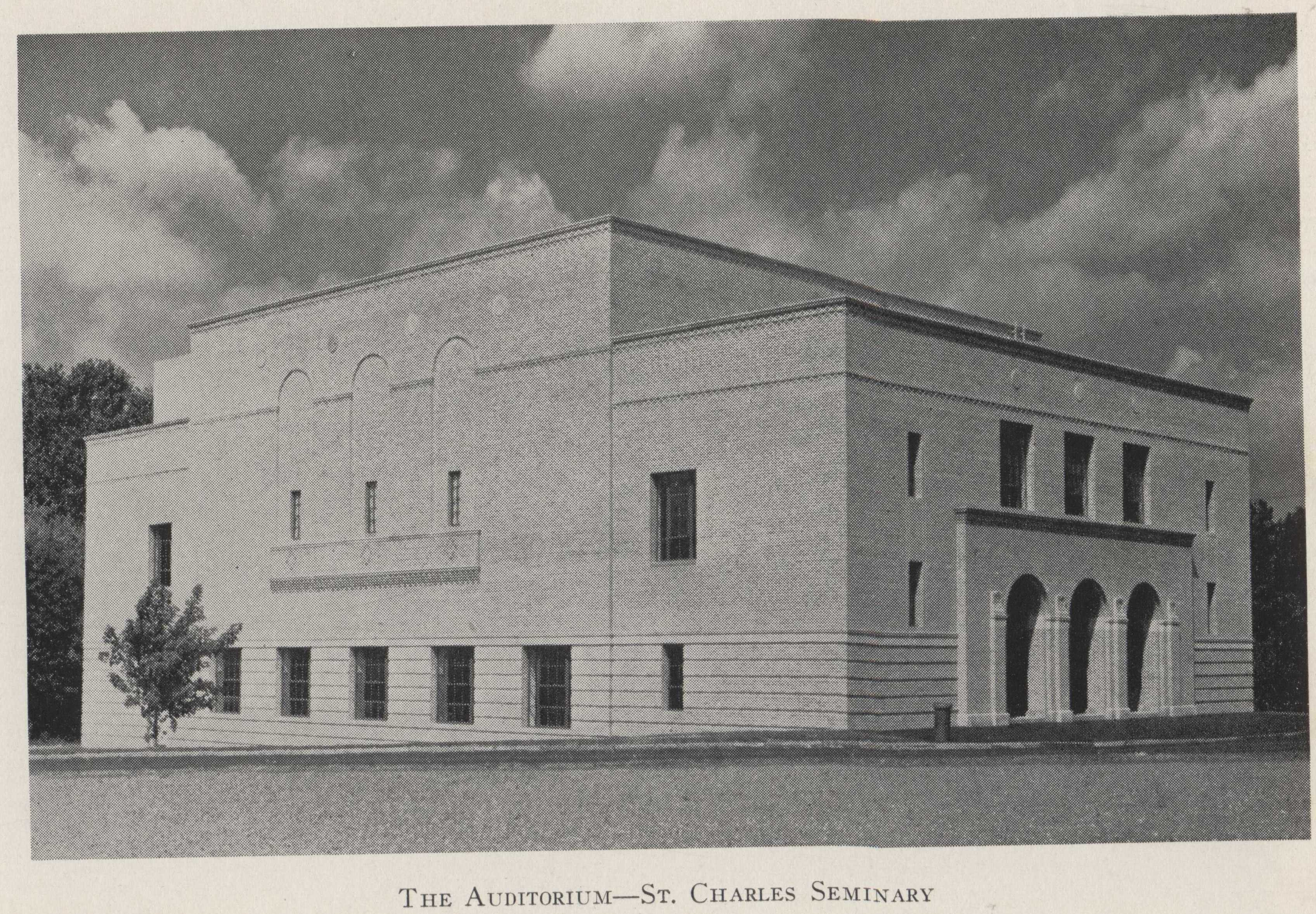
The theatre building at St. Charles in 1943.

Since St. Charles is an all-male school, the theatre department has had to use different methods to incorporate the female roles of plays and musicals. Both prep school and seminary students performed the first plays at St. Charles in 1929 under the direction of Monsignor Joseph A. Cousins. Female roles were played by male students dressing up as women until 1971. It was then that Mrs. Teresa McLean (the school's biology teacher) became the first woman to perform in a St. Charles play. The next year, female students from St. Joseph Academy and Bishop Watterson High School played female parts in a production. Ever since then, female roles for plays have been filled by open auditions from women at other Central Ohio schools.

== Notable alumni ==
- Robert D. Walter: Founder of Cardinal Health, a Fortune 500 health care services company
- Bob Duffy (basketball, born 1922): Basketball player
- Robert Nugent Lynch: Bishop of St. Petersburg, Florida from 1996 to 2016
- Matt Lampson: MLS Goalkeeper for the Columbus Crew SC
- Aaron Diehl: Jazz pianist
- Nick Muszynski: NCAA basketball player for Belmont Bruins

Being an all boys Catholic school, the institution has a history of producing vocations to the priesthood. As of 2000, 171 high school graduates have been ordained to the priesthood, many of whom also went to St. Charles College. The first priests were ordained in 1927 and at least one alumnus was ordained a priest every year until 1968. There were no priests ordained in 1968, 1969, 1971, 1972, or 1973. From 1975 until 2000, only two priests were ordained in 1977 and one in 1991. Since 2000, many alumni have been ordained priests, with more in formation.

The college also has 121 alumni priests, not including those who also are high school alumni. The first college alumnus was ordained in 1934. There were no priest alumni in 1944, 1947, 1952, 1963, or 1975. The final college alumnus to become a priest was ordained in 1976.

== List of principals and rectors ==
St. Charles Preparatory School

Years	Principal / Rector
1925–1942	Joseph A. Weigand
1942–1945	Edward J. Leinheuser
1945–1957	Paul J. Glenn
1957–1969	Paul J. O'Dea
1958–1969	George T. Woltz
1969–1971	Ralph J. Huntzinger
1971–1976	Charles A. Jackson
1976–1985	Daniel W. Pallay
1985 – 2012	Dominic J. Cavello
2012–2024	James R. Lower
2024–Present	Richard Ey

On August 6, 2024, the Roman Catholic Diocese of Columbus announced that the administrative model of St. Charles would change. Namely, in addition to the principal and vice principals, there would be a Head of School. Former principal Jim Lower became the first head of the school and former vice principal Rick Ey became the principal.

Years	Head of School
2024–Present	James R. Lower

== Athletics ==
Saint Charles is a member of the Ohio High School Athletic Association and Ohio Water Polo. The list as follows:

=== Ohio State Championships ===
- Golf (Div I, 2)- 2009, 2010
- Soccer (A-AA, 2)- 1983, 1985
- Swimming (Div I, 1)- 2008, 2025
- Volleyball (non-OHSAA, 2)- 2009, 2018
- Water Polo (non-OHSAA, 8)- 2010, 2011, 2013, 2014, 2018, 2019, Spring 2021, (Note: Water Polo is usually a fall sport in the State of Ohio. Due to the COVID-19 pandemic, the (fall) 2020 Water Polo season was moved to the spring of 2021. Thus the Spring 2021 win constitutes a three-peat.) 2024, 2025

== Borromean Lecture Series ==
The Borromean Lecture Series is an annual occurrence at Saint Charles, usually during the autumn semester, and is sponsored by Robert Dilenschneider, CEO of The Dilenschneider Group. It is named after the Borromeo family of which Saint Charles was a part of. The speakers are the elite in their field and are listed below:

School Year	Speaker	Occupation
2001-2002	Michael Novak	U.S. Ambassador to the United Nations
2002-2003	Cardinal Avery Dulles, S.J.	Cardinal-Deacon of Holy Names of Jesus and Mary, internationally known author and lecturer
2003-2004	There was no lecture this year	
2004-2005	Joel Klein	Chancellor of the New York City Department of Education
2005-2006	Russell Hittinger, Ph.D.	Warren Professor of Catholic Studies at the University of Tulsa College of Law
2006-2007	Archbishop Celestino Migliore	Apostolic Nuncio and Permanent Observer of the Holy See to the United Nations
2007-2008	Father John I. Jenkins, C.S.C.	President of the University of Notre Dame
2008-2009	Carl A. Anderson	Supreme Knight of the Knights of Columbus
2009-2010	Father Robert F. O'Toole, S.J., S.S.D.	President of the Gregorian University Foundation
2010-2011	Father Jeffery von Arx, S.J.	President of the Fairfield University Foundation
2011-2012	William McGurn	Vice President of News Corporation
2012-2013	John H. Garvey	President of the Catholic University of America
2013-2014	Allan E. Goodman	President of the Institute of International Education
2014-2015	Father Michael J. Garanzini, S.J.	President of Loyola University Chicago
2015-2016	Steve Forbes	Chairman and editor-in-chief of Forbes
2016-2017	Susan Eisenhower	President of the Eisenhower Group
2017-2018	Kenneth L. Woodward	Editor of Newsweek's Religion section (retired)
2018-2019	Gerard Baker	Editor-at-large of The Wall Street Journal
2019-2020	Joseph E. Nyre, Ph.D.	President of Seton Hall University
2020-2021	Did not take place due to the COVID-19 pandemic	
2021-2022	Monsignor Thomas W. Powers	Vicar General of Diocese of Bridgeport, later Rector of the Pontifical North American College
2022-2023	Louis Nanni	Vice President for University Relations at the University of Notre Dame
2023-2024	Father Enrique Salvo	Rector of St. Patrick's Cathedral in New York
2024-2025	Cardinal Timothy Dolan	Cardinal-Priest Archbishop of New York
2025-2026	Joe Mazzulla	Coach of the Boston Celtics

== See also ==
- List of high schools in Ohio
