= Automated dispensing cabinet =

Computerized medicine cabinet

An automated dispensing cabinet (ADC), also called a unit-based cabinet (UBC), automated dispensing device (ADD), or automated dispensing machine (ADM), is a computerized medicine cabinet for hospitals and healthcare settings. ADCs allow medications to be stored and dispensed near the point of care while controlling and tracking drug distribution.

== Overview ==
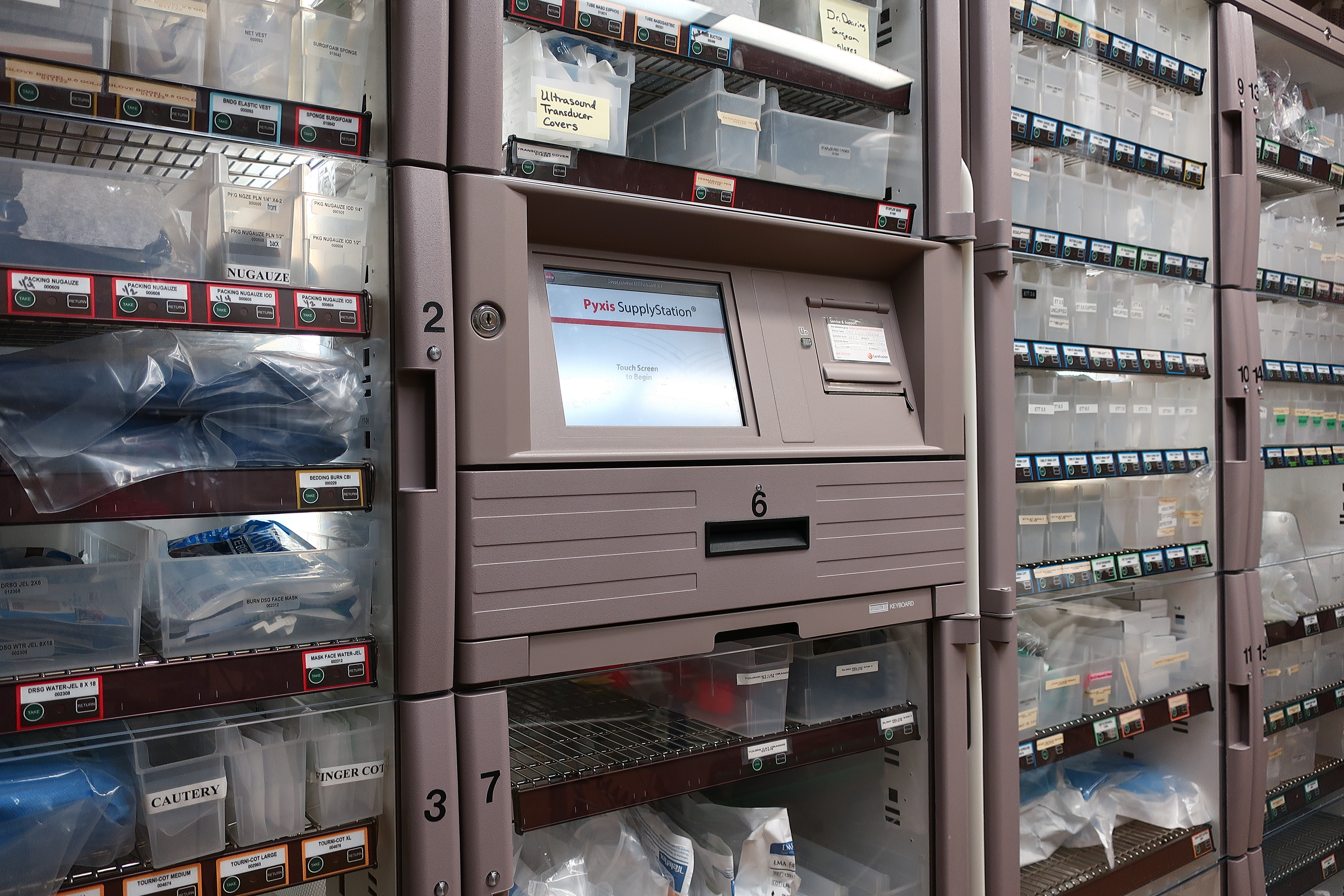
A Pyxis SupplyStation at Campbell County Memorial Hospital in Gillette, Wyoming

Hospital pharmacies have provided medications for patients by filling patient-specific cassettes of unit-dose medications that were then delivered to the nursing unit and stored in medication cabinets or carts. ADCs, originally designed for hospital use, were introduced in hospitals in the 1980s and have facilitated the transition to alternative delivery models and more decentralized medication distribution systems.^{[2]} Implementing automated dispensing cabinets as part of a decentralized or hybrid medication distribution system can improve patient safety and the accountability of the inventory, streamline certain billing processes.

However, in the 2000s, the technology began to be deployed into other care settings where medication doses were stored onsite, and higher security methods were needed to control inventory, access, and dispensing of each patient dose. Settings that now deploy ADCs include long-term care facilities, hospice, critical access hospitals, surgery centers, group homes, residential care facilities, rehab and psych environments, animal health, dental clinics, and nursing education simulation. These diverse care settings share a common need to safely store, account for, and dispense individual doses of medications, especially narcotics and high-value medications, at the point of care.^{[3]}

ADCs track user access and dispensed medications, and their use can improve control over medication inventory. The real-time inventory reports generated by many cabinets can simplify the filling process and help the pharmacy track expired drugs. Furthermore, by restricting individual drugs – such as high-risk medications and controlled substances – to unique drawers within the cabinet, overall inventory management, patient safety, and medication security can be improved. Automated dispensing cabinets allow the pharmacy department to profile physician orders before they are dispensed.^{[4]}

ADCs can also enable providers to record medication charges upon dispensing, reducing the billing paperwork the pharmacy is responsible for. In addition, nurses can note returned medications using the cabinets' computers, enabling direct credits to patients' accounts. Since automated cabinets can be located on the nursing unit floor, nursing have speedier access to a patient's medications. Also, shorter waiting time ensures improved patient comfort and care.^{[5]}

== Role of automated dispensing in healthcare ==
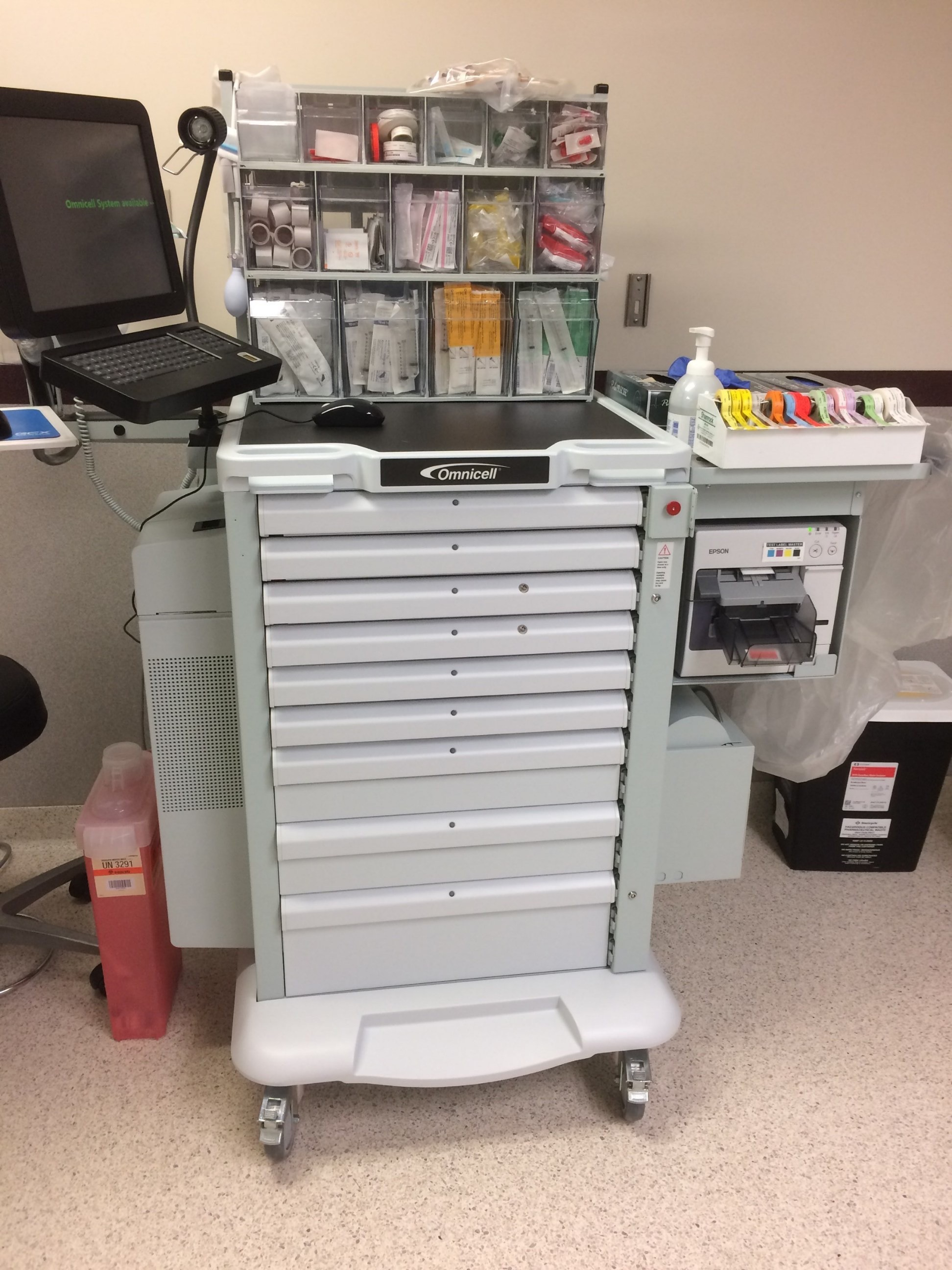
XT Anesthesia Workstation, an automated dispensing cabinet used in hospital operating rooms

Automated dispensing is a pharmacy practice in which a device dispenses medications and fills prescriptions. ADCs, which can handle many different medications, are available from a number of manufacturers such as BD, ARxIUM, and Omnicell. Though members of the pharmacy community have been utilizing automation technology since the 1980s, companies are constantly improving ADCs to meet changing needs and health standards in the industry.

Several goals can be met by implementing an automated product in a healthcare facility. Patient safety can be ensured with the use of ADC technology such as barcoding. Anesthesia ADCs in operating rooms and perioperative areas may include label printing to prevent mix-ups such as errors between morphine and hydromorphone, two different opioid analgesics that frequently get confused. These systems also communicate with the pharmacy and its information management system to track medications removed and support inventory replenishment.

== Key features ==
ADCs are like automated teller machines whose specific technologies such as barcode scanning and clinical decision support can improve medication safety. Some have metal locking drawers for added security and some have automated single-dose dispensing to prevent the need for a blind count each time a controlled substance is accessed. Over the years, ADCs have been adapted to facilitate compliance with emerging regulatory requirements such as pharmacy review of medication orders and safe practice recommendations.

ADCs incorporate advanced software and electronic interfaces to synthesize high-risk steps in the medication use process. These unit-based medication repositories provide computer-controlled storage, dispensation, tracking, and documentation of medication distribution in the resident care unit. Since automated dispensing cabinets are not located in the pharmacy, they are considered "decentralized" medication distribution systems. Instead, they can be found at the point of care on the resident care unit. Tracking of the stocking and distribution process can occur by interfacing the unit with a central pharmacy computer. These cabinets can also be interfaced with other external databases such as resident profiles, the facility's admission/discharge/transfer system, and billing systems.

Most ADC providers offer scalable systems since several important factors vary widely by facility such as budget, physical room size, patient population/demographics, type of healthcare facility, etc.

== See also ==
- Pharmacy automation
- Remote dispensing
- Pyxis Corporation
- Omnicell
