= John Michael Fitzpatrick =

John Michael Fitzpatrick is an American physicist and computer scientist and is a professor emeritus at Vanderbilt University. His research on medical image registration and image-guided surgery contributed to the world's first FDA-cleared surgical navigation system based on bone-implanted fiducial markers, according to Vanderbilt University Medical Center.

== Early life and education ==
He was born in Topeka, Kansas and raised in Charlotte, North Carolina. Fitzpatrick received a Bachelor of Science degree in physics from the University of North Carolina at Chapel Hill in 1967 and a Doctor of Philosophy in physics from Florida State University in 1972. He later earned a Master of Science in computer science from the University of North Carolina at Chapel Hill in 1982.

== Career ==
Before joining Vanderbilt, Fitzpatrick held postdoctoral and teaching positions in physics and chemistry at Florida State University, the University of British Columbia, and Clemson University, and was a professor of physics and chair of the mathematics and physics department at Newberry College.

He joined Vanderbilt University in 1982 as an assistant professor of computer science and subsequently held joint faculty appointments in radiology, neurological surgery, computer engineering, and electrical engineering. He was named full professor in each of these departments in 1999 and retired with the title of professor emeritus in December 2010.

Fitzpatrick's research focused on the registration of medical images, the alignment of scans from different imaging modalities or time points, and its application to image-guided neurosurgery and image-guided cochlear implantation. From 1988 to 1995, he was co-principal investigator and director of software development at Vanderbilt for a bone-implanted fiducial marker system for surgical navigation, which, according to Vanderbilt University Medical Center, was the world's first such system to receive U.S. Food and Drug Administration clearance (FDA 510(k) clearance K944612, December 11, 1995).

With his graduate students, he developed statistical methods for predicting and assessing the accuracy of image registration, including measures of fiducial registration error and target registration error, which became widely used benchmarks for evaluating surgical guidance systems. He is the holder or co-holder of 20 U.S. patents related to image registration, fiducial markers, and surgical instrumentation, including the Microtable, a frame-less neurosurgical system for probe guidance used in procedures such as deep-brain stimulation for Parkinson’s disease. The Microtable System received [FDA 510(k) clearance K132611, Mar. 6, 2014]

== Honors and awards ==
- 1997 Giovanni Di Chiro Award for Outstanding Scientific Research, Journal of Computer Assisted Tomography.
- Fellow, SPIE (International Society for Optical Engineering), elected 2007
- Fellow, IEEE (Institute of Electrical and Electronics Engineers), effective January 1, 2011, “for contributions to medical image registration and surgical navigation”

== Selected publications ==
- Fitzpatrick, J. Michael; West, Jay B.; Maurer, Calvin R. Jr. “Predicting Error in Rigid-Body, Point-Based Image Registration.” IEEE Transactions on Medical Imaging, vol. 17, no. 5, 1998, pp. 694–702.
- Sonka, Milan; Fitzpatrick, J. Michael, eds. Medical Image Processing and Analysis, Volume II of the Handbook of Medical Imaging. SPIE Press, 2000. ISBN 978-0819477606.
- Fitzpatrick, J. Michael; Lédeczi, Ákos. Computer Programming with MATLAB. Fitzle LLC, 2013. ISBN 978-0-615-75113-9.
- Labadie, Robert F.; Fitzpatrick, J. Michael. Image-Guided Surgery: Fundamentals and Clinical Applications in Otolaryngology. Plural Publishing, 2016. ISBN 978-1597567190.

== Personal life ==
Fitzpatrick is married to retired pediatrician Patricia F. Robinson. They have two children and three grandchildren and live in Nashville, Tennessee.
