= March 24 =

March 24 this year in various calendars
- Tuesday, 24 March 2026
Akan	Fobene
Armenian	7 Ahekani 1475
Aztec	Huei Tecuilhuitl 13, 9 Cipactli
Babylonian	4 Adaru, 2336 SE
Balinese pawukon	Luang, Pepet, Pasah, Sri, Keliwon, Tungleh, Anggara of Dukut, Ludra, Urungan, Pati
Bengali	10 Chaitro, BS 1432
Chinese	Yin Fire Rooster・Turtle Beak Mansion; Fire Horse Year, Month 2, Day 6 (Chunfen, 12 days until Qingming)
Common Era	24 March 2026 CE
Coptic	15 Paremhat, AM 1742
Egyptian	12 Mesori, 2774 NE
Ethiopian	15 Magābit, 2018 Amätä Məhrät
French Republican	Décade I, Quartidi de Germinal de l'Année 234 de la République
Gregorian	24 March, AD 2026
Hebrew	6 Nisan, AM 5786
Hindu	Rohiṇi・Prīti; Solar: 11 Caitra, 1947 SE; Lunisolar: Ṣaṣṭhī, Śukla pakṣa of Caitra, 2083 VE; Rāudra・5126 KY・1,872,658
Icelandic	Þriðjudagur, 1 Einmánuður 2025
Islamic	5 Shawwal, AH 1447 (using tabular method)
ISO week date	2026-W13-2
Japanese	6 Kisaragi, Reiwa 8 (Shunbun, 12 days until Seimei)
Julian	11 March, AD 2026 (AM 7534)
Julian day	2461124
Korean	6 Tokkidal, 4359 DE
Maya	13.0.13.8.1; 19 Cumku, 9 Imix
Roman	ante diem V Idus Martias, MMDCCLXXIX AUC
Solar Hijri	4 Farvardin, SH 1405
Tibetan	6 dbo, me pho rta 2153 or 1772 or 1000

<<	March					>>
Su	Mo	Tu	We	Th	Fr	Sa
1	2	3	4	5	6	7
8	9	10	11	12	13	14
15	16	17	18	19	20	21
22	23	24	25	26	27	28
29	30	31
2026

March 24 in recent years
2026 (Tuesday)
2025 (Monday)
2024 (Sunday)
2023 (Friday)
2022 (Thursday)
2021 (Wednesday)
2020 (Tuesday)
2019 (Sunday)
2018 (Saturday)
2017 (Friday)

March 24 is the 83rd day of the year (84th in leap years) in the Gregorian calendar; 282 days remain until the end of the year.

== Events ==
=== Pre-1600 ===
- 1199 – King Richard I of England is wounded by a crossbow bolt while fighting in France, leading to his death on April 6.
- 1387 – English victory over a Franco-Castilian-Flemish fleet in the Battle of Margate off the coast of Margate.
- 1401 – Turco-Mongol emperor Timur sacks Damascus.

=== 1601–1900 ===
- 1603 – James VI of Scotland is proclaimed King James I of England and Ireland, upon the death of Elizabeth I.
- 1603 – Tokugawa Ieyasu is granted the title of shōgun from Emperor Go-Yōzei, and establishes the Tokugawa shogunate in Edo, Japan.
- 1663 – The Province of Carolina is granted by charter to eight Lords Proprietor in reward for their assistance in restoring Charles II of England to the throne.
- 1720 – Count Frederick of Hesse-Kassel is elected King of Sweden by the Riksdag of the Estates, after his consort Ulrika Eleonora abdicated the throne on 29 February.
- 1721 – Johann Sebastian Bach dedicates six concertos to Margrave Christian Ludwig of Brandenburg-Schwedt, now commonly called the Brandenburg Concertos, BWV 1046–1051.
- 1765 – Great Britain passes the Quartering Act, which requires the Thirteen Colonies to house British troops.
- 1794 – In Kraków, Tadeusz Kościuszko announces a general uprising against Imperial Russia and the Kingdom of Prussia, and assumes the powers of the Commander in Chief of all of the Polish forces.
- 1829 – The Parliament of the United Kingdom passes the Roman Catholic Relief Act 1829, allowing Catholics to serve in Parliament.
- 1832 – In Hiram, Ohio, a group of men beat and tar and feather Mormon leader Joseph Smith.
- 1854 – President José Gregorio Monagas abolishes slavery in Venezuela.
- 1860 – Sakuradamon Incident: Japanese chief minister (Tairō) Ii Naosuke is assassinated by rōnin samurai outside the Sakurada Gate of Edo Castle.
- 1869 – The last of Tītokowaru's forces surrender to the New Zealand government, ending his uprising.
- 1870 – A Chilean prospecting party led by José Díaz Gana discovers the silver ores of Caracoles in the Bolivian portion of Atacama Desert, leading to the last of the Chilean silver rushes and a diplomatic dispute over its taxation between Chile and Bolivia.
- 1878 – The British frigate HMS Eurydice sinks, killing more than 300.
- 1882 – Robert Koch announces the discovery of Mycobacterium tuberculosis, the bacterium responsible for tuberculosis.
- 1900 – Mayor of New York City Robert Anderson Van Wyck breaks ground for a new underground "Rapid Transit Railroad" that would link Manhattan and Brooklyn.
- 1900 – Carnegie Steel Company is formed in New Jersey; its capitalization of $160 million is the largest to date.

=== 1901–present ===
- 1921 – The 1921 Women's Olympiad begins in Monte Carlo, becoming the first international women's sports event.
- 1922 – The McMahon killings take place in Belfast. Six Catholic civilians are shot dead, two others wounded and a female family member assaulted. Police were suspected as being responsible, but no one was prosecuted.
- 1927 – Nanking Incident: Foreign warships bombard Nanjing, China, in defence of the foreign citizens within the city.
- 1934 – The Tydings–McDuffie Act is passed by the United States Congress, allowing the Philippines to become a self-governing commonwealth.
- 1939 – The 1939 Liechtenstein putsch takes place; approximately 40 members of the VBDL starting from Nendeln march towards Vaduz with the intention of overthrowing the government and provoking Liechtenstein's annexation into Germany.
- 1944 – German troops massacre 335 Italian civilians in Rome.
- 1944 – World War II: In an event later dramatized in the movie The Great Escape, 76 Allied prisoners of war begin breaking out of the German camp Stalag Luft III.
- 1946 – A British Cabinet Mission arrives in India to discuss and plan for the transfer of power from the British Raj to Indian leadership.
- 1949 – Hanns Albin Rauter, a chief SS and Police Leader in the Netherlands, is convicted and executed for crimes against humanity.
- 1972 – Direct rule is imposed on Northern Ireland by the Government of the United Kingdom under Edward Heath.
- 1976 – In Argentina, the armed forces overthrow the constitutional government of President Isabel Perón and start a seven-year dictatorial period self-styled the National Reorganization Process.
- 1977 – Morarji Desai becomes the prime minister of India, the first prime minister not to belong to Indian National Congress.
- 1980 – El Salvadorian Archbishop Óscar Romero is assassinated while celebrating Mass in San Salvador.
- 1982 – Bangladeshi President Abdus Sattar is deposed in a bloodless coup led by Army Chief Lieutenant general Hussain Muhammad Ershad, who suspends the Constitution and imposes martial law.
- 1986 – The Loscoe gas explosion leads to new UK laws on landfill gas migration and gas protection on landfill sites.
- 1989 – In Prince William Sound in Alaska, the Exxon Valdez spills 240,000 barrels (38,000 m^{3}) of crude oil after running aground.
- 1990 – Indian intervention in the Sri Lankan Civil War ends with the last ship of Indian Peace Keeping Force leaving Sri Lanka.
- 1992 – Space Shuttle Atlantis launches on STS-45.
- 1998 – Mitchell Johnson and Andrew Golden, aged 11 and 13 respectively, open fire upon teachers and students at Westside Middle School in Jonesboro, Arkansas; five people are killed and ten are wounded.
- 1998 – A tornado sweeps through Dantan in India, killing 250 people and injuring 3,000 others.
- 1998 – Dr. Rüdiger Marmulla performs the first computer-assisted Bone Segment Navigation at the University of Regensburg, Germany.
- 1999 – Kosovo War: NATO begins attacks on Yugoslavia without United Nations Security Council (UNSC) approval, marking the first time NATO has attacked a sovereign country.
- 1999 – A lorry carrying margarine and flour catches fire inside the Mont Blanc Tunnel, creating an inferno that kills 39 people.
- 2008 – Bhutan officially becomes a democracy, with its first ever general election.
- 2015 – Germanwings Flight 9525 crashes in the French Alps in an apparent pilot mass murder-suicide, killing all 150 people on board.
- 2018 – Syrian civil war: The Turkish Armed Forces (TAF) and Syrian National Army (SNA) take full control of Afrin District, marking the end of the Afrin offensive.
- 2018 – Students across the United States stage the March for Our Lives demanding gun control in response to the Stoneman Douglas High School shooting.
- 2023 – An EF4 tornado strikes the towns of Rolling Fork and Silver City, Mississippi, causing mass destruction.
- 2024 – The 2024 Senegalese presidential election is held following anti-government protests.
- 2026 – OpenAI announces that their flagship Sora app and API are shutting down.

== Births ==
=== Pre-1600 ===
- 1103 – Yue Fei, Chinese military general (died 1142)
- 1441 – Ernest, Elector of Saxony, German ruler of Saxony (died 1486)
- 1494 – Georgius Agricola, German mineralogist and scholar (died 1555)
- 1577 – Francis, Duke of Pomerania-Stettin, Bishop of Cammin (died 1620)

=== 1601–1900 ===
- 1607 – Michiel de Ruyter, Dutch admiral (died 1667)
- 1628 – Sophie Amalie of Brunswick-Lüneburg (died 1685)
- 1657 – Arai Hakuseki, Japanese academic and politician (died 1725)
- 1693 – John Harrison, English carpenter and clock-maker, invented the Marine chronometer (died 1776)
- 1725 – Samuel Ashe, American lawyer and politician, 9th governor of North Carolina (died 1813)
- 1725 – Thomas Cushing, American lawyer and politician, 1st lieutenant governor of Massachusetts (died 1788)
- 1755 – Rufus King, American lawyer and politician, United States Ambassador to the United Kingdom (died 1827)
- 1762 – Marcos Portugal, Portuguese organist and composer (died 1830)
- 1775 – Muthuswami Dikshitar, Indian poet and composer (died 1835)
- 1782 – Orest Kiprensky, Russian-Italian painter (died 1836)
- 1796 – Zulma Carraud, French author (died 1889)
- 1796 – John Corry Wilson Daly, Canadian businessman and politician (died 1878)
- 1803 – Egerton Ryerson, Canadian minister, educator, and politician (died 1882)
- 1808 – Maria Malibran, Spanish-French soprano (died 1836)
- 1809 – Mariano José de Larra, Spanish journalist and author (died 1837)
- 1809 – Joseph Liouville, French mathematician and academic (died 1882)
- 1816 – Pelagio Antonio de Labastida y Dávalos, Mexican politician and Roman Catholic archbishop, regent during the Second Mexican Empire (died 1891)
- 1820 – Edmond Becquerel, French physicist and academic (died 1891)
- 1820 – Fanny Crosby, American poet and composer (died 1915)
- 1823 – Thomas Spencer Baynes, English philosopher and critic (died 1887)
- 1826 – Matilda Joslyn Gage, American activist and author (died 1898)
- 1828 – Horace Gray, American lawyer and jurist (died 1902)
- 1829 – George Francis Train, American businessman (died 1904)
- 1829 – Ignacio Zaragoza, Mexican general (died 1862)
- 1830 – Robert Hamerling, Austrian poet and playwright (died 1889)
- 1834 – William Morris, English textile designer, poet, and author (died 1896)
- 1834 – John Wesley Powell, American soldier, geologist, and explorer (died 1902)
- 1835 – Joseph Stefan, Slovene physicist, mathematician, and poet (died 1893)
- 1848 – Honoré Beaugrand, Canadian journalist and politician, 18th mayor of Montreal (died 1906)
- 1850 – Silas Hocking, English minister and author (died 1935)
- 1854 – Henry Lefroy, Australian politician, 11th premier of Western Australia (died 1930)
- 1855 – Andrew W. Mellon, American banker, financier, and diplomat, 49th United States Secretary of the Treasury (died 1937)
- 1855 – Olive Schreiner, South African author and activist (died 1920)
- 1862 – Frank Weston Benson, American painter and educator (died 1951)
- 1869 – Émile Fabre, French author and playwright (died 1955)
- 1871 – Alec Hurley, English music hall singer (died 1913)
- 1874 – Luigi Einaudi, Italian economist and politician, 2nd president of the Italian Republic (died 1961)
- 1874 – Harry Houdini, Hungarian-American magician and actor (died 1926)
- 1875 – William Burns, Canadian lacrosse player (died 1953)
- 1879 – Neyzen Tevfik, Turkish philosopher, poet, and composer (died 1953)
- 1882 – Marcel Lalu, French gymnast (died 1951)
- 1882 – George Monckton-Arundell, 8th Viscount Galway, English politician, 5th governor-general of New Zealand (died 1943)
- 1883 – Dorothy Campbell, Scottish-American golfer (died 1945)
- 1884 – Peter Debye, Dutch-American physicist and chemist, Nobel Prize laureate (died 1966)
- 1884 – Chika Kuroda, Japanese chemist (died 1968)
- 1884 – Eugène Tisserant, French cardinal (died 1972)
- 1885 – Charles Daniels, American swimmer (died 1973)
- 1885 – Dimitrie Cuclin, Romanian violinist and composer (died 1978)
- 1886 – Edward Weston, American photographer (died 1958)
- 1886 – Robert Mallet-Stevens, French architect and designer (died 1945)
- 1887 – Roscoe Arbuckle, American actor, director, and screenwriter (died 1933)
- 1888 – Viktor Kingissepp, Estonian politician (died 1922)
- 1889 – Albert Hill, English-Canadian runner (died 1969)
- 1890 – Agnes Macphail, Canadian educator and politician (died 1954)
- 1891 – Sergey Ivanovich Vavilov, Russian physicist and academic (died 1951)
- 1892 – Marston Morse, American mathematician and academic (died 1977)
- 1893 – Walter Baade, German astronomer and author (died 1960)
- 1893 – George Sisler, American baseball player and scout (died 1973)
- 1897 – Wilhelm Reich, Austrian-American psychotherapist and academic (died 1957)

=== 1901–present ===
- 1901 – Ub Iwerks, American animator, director, and producer, co-created Mickey Mouse (died 1971)
- 1901 – José Nasazzi, Uruguayan footballer (died 1968)
- 1902 – Thomas E. Dewey, American lawyer and politician, 47th governor of New York (died 1971)
- 1903 – Adolf Butenandt, German biochemist and academic, Nobel Prize laureate (died 1995)
- 1903 – Malcolm Muggeridge, English journalist, author, and scholar (died 1990)
- 1905 – Pura Santillan-Castrence, Filipino author and diplomat (died 2007)
- 1907 – Paul Sauvé, Canadian lawyer and politician, 17th premier of Quebec (died 1960)
- 1909 – Clyde Barrow, American criminal (died 1934)
- 1909 – Richard Wurmbrand, Romanian pastor and evangelist (died 2001)
- 1910 – Richard Conte, American actor, singer, and director (died 1975)
- 1911 – Joseph Barbera, American animator, director, and producer, co-founded Hanna-Barbera (died 2006)
- 1912 – Dorothy Height, American educator and activist (died 2010)
- 1915 – Eugène Martin, French racing driver (died 2006)
- 1916 – Donald Hamilton, Swedish-American soldier and author (died 2006)
- 1916 – Harry B. Whittington, English palaeontologist and academic (died 2010)
- 1917 – Constantine Andreou, Greek painter and sculptor (died 2007)
- 1917 – John Kendrew, English biochemist and crystallographer, Nobel Prize laureate (died 1997)
- 1919 – Lawrence Ferlinghetti, American poet and publisher, co-founded City Lights Bookstore (died 2021)
- 1919 – Robert Heilbroner, American economist and historian (died 2005)
- 1920 – Gene Nelson, American actor, director, and screenwriter (died 1996)
- 1920 – Mary Stolz, American author (died 2006)
- 1921 – Franciszek Blachnicki, Polish priest (died 1987)
- 1921 – Vasily Smyslov, Russian chess player (died 2010)
- 1922 – Onna White, Canadian dancer and choreographer (died 2005)
- 1923 – Murray Hamilton, American actor (died 1986)
- 1923 – Michael Legat, English author and publisher (died 2011)
- 1924 – Norman Fell, American actor (died 1998)
- 1926 – Desmond Connell, Irish cardinal (died 2017)
- 1926 – Dario Fo, Italian playwright, actor, director, and composer, Nobel Prize laureate (died 2016)
- 1926 – William Porter, American hurdler (died 2000)
- 1927 – John Woodland Hastings, American biochemist and academic (died 2014)
- 1927 – Martin Walser, German author and playwright (died 2023)
- 1928 – Byron Janis, American pianist and composer (died 2024)
- 1929 – Pat Renella, Italian-American actor (died 2012)
- 1930 – David Dacko, Central African politician, 1st president of the Central African Republic (died 2003)
- 1930 – Steve McQueen, American actor and producer (died 1980)
- 1931 – Hanno Drechsler, German educator and politician, Mayor of Marburg (died 2003)
- 1933 – Stephen De Staebler, American sculptor and educator (died 2011)
- 1933 – Lee Mendelson, American television producer (died 2019)
- 1935 – Carol Kaye, American bass guitarist
- 1936 – Don Covay, American singer-songwriter (died 2015)
- 1936 – Alex Olmedo, Peruvian-American tennis player (died 2020)
- 1937 – Billy Stewart, American singer and pianist (died 1970)
- 1938 – Holger Czukay, German musician (died 2017)
- 1938 – David Irving, English historian and author
- 1938 – Larry Wilson, American football player (died 2020)
- 1940 – Bob Mackie, American fashion designer (died 2026)
- 1941 – Michael Masser, American songwriter, composer and producer (died 2015)
- 1942 – Jesús Alou, Dominican baseball player (died 2023)
- 1943 – Kazuo Ueda, Japanese Yiddishist
- 1944 – R. Lee Ermey, American sergeant and actor (died 2018)
- 1944 – Vojislav Koštunica, Serbian academic and politician, 8th prime minister of Serbia
- 1945 – Robert T. Bakker, American paleontologist and academic
- 1945 – Curtis Hanson, American director, producer, and screenwriter (died 2016)
- 1945 – Patrick Malahide, English actor and screenwriter
- 1946 – Klaus Dinger, German guitarist and songwriter (died 2008)
- 1946 – Kitty O'Neil, American stuntwoman (died 2018)
- 1947 – Dennis Erickson, American football player and coach
- 1947 – Christine Gregoire, American lawyer and politician, 22nd governor of Washington
- 1947 – Mick Jones, English footballer and coach (died 2022)
- 1947 – Alan Sugar, English businessman
- 1948 – Javier Diez Canseco, Peruvian sociologist and politician (died 2013)
- 1948 – Jerzy Kukuczka, Polish mountaineer (died 1989)
- 1949 – Tabitha King, American author and poet
- 1949 – Ruud Krol, Dutch footballer and coach
- 1949 – Steve Lang, Canadian bass player (died 2017)
- 1949 – Ali Akbar Salehi, Iranian academic and politician, 36th Foreign Affairs Minister of Iran
- 1949 – Ranil Wickremesinghe, Sri Lankan lawyer and politician, 13th prime minister of Sri Lanka
- 1950 – Gary Wichard, American football player and agent (died 2011)
- 1951 – Peter Boyle, Scottish-Australian footballer and manager (died 2013)
- 1951 – Pat Bradley, American golfer
- 1951 – Tommy Hilfiger, American fashion designer, founded the Tommy Hilfiger Corporation
- 1951 – Anna Włodarczyk, Polish long jumper and coach
- 1952 – Greg McCrary, American football player (died 2013)
- 1953 – Anita L. Allen, American lawyer, philosopher, and academic
- 1953 – Louie Anderson, American actor and comedian (died 2022)
- 1954 – Rafael Orozco Maestre, Colombian singer (died 1992)
- 1955 – Doug Jarvis, Canadian ice hockey player and coach
- 1955 – Pat Price, Canadian ice hockey player and coach
- 1956 – Steve Ballmer, American businessman
- 1956 – Bill Wray, American cartoonist and painter
- 1957 – Pierre Harvey, Canadian cyclist and skier
- 1958 – Mike Woodson, American basketball player and coach
- 1959 – Emmit King, American sprinter (died 2021)
- 1959 – Renaldo Nehemiah, American hurdler and football player
- 1959 – Derek Statham, English footballer
- 1960 – Jan Berglin, Swedish cartoonist
- 1960 – Barry Horowitz, American wrestler
- 1960 – Nena, German singer-songwriter and actress
- 1960 – Scott Pruett, American race car driver
- 1960 – Annabella Sciorra, American actress
- 1961 – Dean Jones, Australian cricketer and coach (died 2020)
- 1961 – Yanis Varoufakis, Greek economist and politician, Greek Minister of Finance
- 1962 – Angèle Dubeau, Canadian violinist
- 1962 – Irina Meszynski, German discus thrower
- 1963 – Vadym Tyshchenko, Ukrainian footballer and manager (died 2015)
- 1963 – Raimond van der Gouw, Dutch footballer and coach
- 1963 – Torsten Voss, German decathlete and bobsledder
- 1964 – Patterson Hood, American singer-songwriter
- 1966 – Floyd Heard, American sprinter and coach
- 1966 – Rico Hizon, Filipino broadcast journalist
- 1967 – Diann Roffe, American skier
- 1968 – Minarti Timur, Indonesian badminton player
- 1969 – Stephan Eberharter, Austrian skier
- 1969 – Ilir Meta, Albanian politician, incumbent president of Albania
- 1970 – Judith Draxler, Austrian swimmer
- 1970 – Erica Kennedy, American journalist and author (died 2012)
- 1970 – Mike Vanderjagt, Canadian-American football player
- 1972 – Christophe Dugarry, French footballer
- 1972 – Steve Karsay, American baseball player and coach
- 1973 – Jacek Bąk, Polish footballer
- 1973 – Jim Parsons, American actor
- 1973 – Philippe Boucher, Canadian ice hockey player and manager
- 1973 – Steve Corica, Australian footballer and coach
- 1973 – Jure Ivanušič, Slovenian actor, concert pianist and chansonnier
- 1973 – Mette Jacobsen, Danish swimmer
- 1973 – Glen Jakovich, Australian footballer
- 1974 – Sergey Klyugin, Russian high jumper
- 1975 – Thomas Johansson, Swedish-Monégasque tennis player
- 1976 – Aaron Brooks, American football player
- 1976 – Aliou Cissé, Senegalese footballer and coach
- 1976 – Annette Dasch, German soprano
- 1976 – Athanasios Kostoulas, Greek footballer
- 1977 – Maxim Kuznetsov, Russian ice hockey player
- 1978 – Amir Arison, American actor
- 1978 – Michael Braun, Australian footballer and coach
- 1978 – Tomáš Ujfaluši, Czech footballer and manager
- 1978 – José Valverde, Dominican baseball player
- 1979 – Norris Hopper, American baseball player
- 1979 – Periklis Iakovakis, Greek hurdler
- 1979 – Graeme Swann, English cricketer
- 1980 – Ramzi Abid, Canadian ice hockey player
- 1980 – Andrew Hutchinson, American ice hockey player
- 1980 – Tassos Venetis, Greek footballer
- 1981 – Mike Adams, American football player
- 1981 – Ron Hainsey, American ice hockey player
- 1981 – Dirk Hayhurst, American baseball player
- 1981 – Mark Looms, Dutch footballer
- 1981 – Gary Paffett, English racing driver
- 1982 – Epico Colon, Puerto Rican professional wrestler
- 1982 – Jake Hager, American mixed martial artist and professional wrestler
- 1982 – Corey Hart, American baseball player
- 1982 – Jimmy Hempte, Belgian footballer
- 1982 – Dustin McGowan, American baseball player
- 1983 – Luca Ceccarelli, Italian footballer
- 1983 – T. J. Ford, American basketball player
- 1983 – Riccardo Musetti, Italian footballer
- 1983 – Pierre-Alexandre Parenteau, Canadian ice hockey player
- 1984 – Benoît Assou-Ekotto, French-Cameroonian footballer
- 1984 – Park Bom, South Korean singer
- 1984 – Chris Bosh, American basketball player
- 1984 – Adrian D'Souza, Indian field hockey player
- 1984 – Lucy Wangui Kabuu, Kenyan runner
- 1984 – Philipp Petzschner, German tennis player
- 1985 – Haruka Ayase, Japanese actress and singer
- 1985 – CJ Perry, American wrestler, manager, and actress
- 1987 – Shakib Al Hasan, Bangladeshi cricketer
- 1987 – Yuma Asami, Japanese actress and singer
- 1987 – Billy Jones, English footballer
- 1987 – Ramires, Brazilian footballer
- 1988 – Aiga Grabuste, Latvian heptathlete
- 1988 – Ryan Higgins, Zimbabwean cricketer
- 1988 – Matías Martínez, Argentinian footballer
- 1988 – Kardo Ploomipuu, Estonian swimmer
- 1988 – Matt Todd, New Zealand rugby union player
- 1989 – Zyzz, Russian-Australian bodybuilder and internet personality (died 2011)
- 1990 – Aljur Abrenica, Filipino actor
- 1990 – Keisha Castle-Hughes, Australian-New Zealand actress
- 1990 – Starlin Castro, American baseball player
- 1990 – Lacey Evans, American wrestler
- 1990 – Alyssa Healy, Australian cricketer
- 1990 – JonTron, American YouTuber
- 1991 – Nick Browne, English cricketer
- 1991 – Dalila Jakupovic, Slovenian tennis player
- 1993 – Daniel Sazonov, Finnish politician
- 1995 – Enzo Zidane, French-Spanish footballer
- 1996 – Myles Turner, American basketball player
- 1997 – Mina, Japanese singer and dancer
- 1998 – Christopher Briney, American actor
- 1998 – Ethel Cain, American singer-songwriter, record producer, and model
- 1998 – Damar Hamlin, American football player
- 1999 – Katie Swan, English tennis player
- 2001 – Clara Burel, French tennis player
- 2004 – Gonzalo García, Spanish footballer

== Deaths ==
=== Pre-1600 ===
- 809 – Harun al-Rashid, Arab caliph (born 763)
- 832 – Wulfred, archbishop of Canterbury
- 1284 – Hugh III of Cyprus (born 1235)
- 1296 – Odon de Pins, Grand Master of the Knights Hospitaller
- 1381 – Catherine of Vadstena, Swedish saint (born 1332)
- 1396 – Walter Hilton, English mystic and saint (born 1340)
- 1399 – Margaret, Duchess of Norfolk (bornc. 1320)
- 1443 – James Douglas, 7th Earl of Douglas (born 1371)
- 1455 – Pope Nicholas V (born 1397)
- 1499 – Edward Stafford, 2nd Earl of Wiltshire, English nobleman (born 1470)
- 1563 – Hosokawa Harumoto, Japanese daimyō (born 1514)
- 1575 – Joseph ben Ephraim Karo, Spanish-Portuguese rabbi and author (born 1488)

=== 1601–1900 ===
- 1603 – Elizabeth I of England (born 1533)
- 1653 – Samuel Scheidt, German organist and composer (born 1587)
- 1684 – Pieter de Hooch, Dutch painter (born 1629)
- 1684 – Elizabeth Ridgeway, English woman convicted of poisoning her husband
- 1773 – Philip Stanhope, 4th Earl of Chesterfield, English politician, Captain of the Yeomen of the Guard (born 1694)
- 1776 – John Harrison, English carpenter and clockmaker, invented the Marine chronometer (born 1693)
- 1824 – Louis Marie de La Révellière-Lépeaux, French lawyer (born 1753)
- 1838 – Abraham Hume, English floriculturist and Tory politician (born 1748/49)
- 1866 – Maria Amalia of Naples and Sicily, Queen of France (born 1782)
- 1869 – Antoine-Henri Jomini, French-Russian general (born 1779)
- 1881 – Achille Ernest Oscar Joseph Delesse, French geologist and mineralogist (born 1817)
- 1882 – Henry Wadsworth Longfellow, American poet and educator (born 1807)
- 1887 – Ivan Kramskoi, Russian painter and critic (born 1837)
- 1888 – Vsevolod Garshin, Russian author (born 1855)

=== 1901–present ===
- 1905 – Jules Verne, French novelist, poet, and playwright (born 1828)
- 1909 – John Millington Synge, Irish playwright and poet (born 1871)
- 1915 – Margaret Lindsay Huggins, Anglo-Irish astronomer (born 1848)
- 1915 – Karol Olszewski, Polish chemist, mathematician, and physicist (born 1846)
- 1916 – Enrique Granados, Spanish pianist and composer (born 1867)
- 1926 – Phan Châu Trinh, Vietnamese activist (born 1872)
- 1932 – Frantz Reichel, French rugby player and hurdler (born 1871)
- 1938 – Yondonwangchug, Mongolian politician (born 1870)
- 1940 – Édouard Branly, French physicist and academic (born 1844)
- 1944 – Orde Wingate, Indian-English general (born 1903)
- 1946 – Alexander Alekhine, Russian chess player (born 1892)
- 1946 – Carl Schuhmann, German gymnast, shot putter, and jumper (born 1869)
- 1948 – Sigrid Hjertén, Swedish painter and illustrator (born 1885)
- 1950 – James Rudolph Garfield, American lawyer and politician, 23rd United States Secretary of the Interior (born 1865)
- 1951 – Lorna Hodgkinson, Australian educator and educational psychologist (born 1887)
- 1953 – Mary of Teck, Queen Consort of George V of the United Kingdom, Empress Consort of India (born 1867)
- 1956 – E. T. Whittaker, British mathematician and physicist (born 1873)
- 1962 – Jean Goldkette, French-American pianist and bandleader (born 1899)
- 1962 – Auguste Piccard, Swiss physicist and explorer (born 1884)
- 1968 – Alice Guy-Blaché, American director, producer, and screenwriter (born 1873)
- 1971 – Arne Jacobsen, Danish architect, designed the Radisson Blu Royal Hotel and Aarhus City Hall (born 1902)
- 1971 – Arthur Metcalfe, Australian public servant (born 1895)
- 1973 – Bertram Stevens, Australian accountant and politician, 25th premier of New South Wales (born 1889)
- 1976 – Bernard Montgomery, 1st Viscount Montgomery of Alamein, English field marshal (born 1887)
- 1978 – Park Mok-wol, influential Korean poet and academic (born 1916)
- 1980 – Óscar Romero, Salvadoran archbishop (born 1917)
- 1984 – Sam Jaffe, American actor (born 1891)
- 1988 – Turhan Feyzioğlu, Turkish academic and politician, 27th deputy prime minister of Turkey (born 1922)
- 1990 – Ray Goulding, American comedian and radio host (born 1922)
- 1991 – John Kerr, Australian lawyer and politician, 18th governor-general of Australia (born 1914)
- 1993 – Albert Arlen, Australian pianist, composer, actor, and playwright (born 1905)
- 1993 – John Hersey, American journalist and author (born 1914)
- 1995 – Joseph Needham, English historian and academic (born 1900)
- 1999 – Gertrud Scholtz-Klink, German politician (born 1902)
- 1999 – Birdie Tebbetts, American baseball player and manager (born 1912)
- 2001 – Muriel Young, English television host and producer (born 1928)
- 2002 – César Milstein, Argentinian-English biochemist and academic, Nobel Prize laureate (born 1927)
- 2002 – Bob Said, American race car driver and bobsledder (born 1932)
- 2003 – Hans Hermann Groër, Austrian cardinal (born 1919)
- 2006 – Rudra Rajasingham, Sri Lankan police officer and diplomat (born 1926)
- 2007 – Shripad Narayan Pendse, Indian Marathi novelist (born 1913)
- 2008 – Chalmers Alford, American guitarist (born 1955)
- 2008 – Neil Aspinall, Welsh-English record producer and manager (born 1941)
- 2008 – Rafael Azcona, Spanish author and screenwriter (born 1926)
- 2008 – Richard Widmark, American actor (born 1914)
- 2008 – Boris Dvornik, Croatian actor (born 1939)
- 2009 – George Kell, American baseball player and sportscaster (born 1922)
- 2009 – Hans Klenk, German racing driver (born 1919)
- 2009 – Gábor Ocskay, Hungarian ice hockey player (born 1975)
- 2010 – Robert Culp, American actor (born 1930)
- 2010 – Jim Marshall, American photographer (born 1936)
- 2012 – Paul Callaghan, New Zealand physicist and academic (born 1947)
- 2012 – Nick Noble, American singer-songwriter (born 1926)
- 2013 – Barbara Anderson, New Zealand author (born 1926)
- 2013 – Inge Lønning, Norwegian theologian, academic, and politician (born 1938)
- 2013 – Gury Marchuk, Russian physicist, mathematician, and academic (born 1925)
- 2013 – Paolo Ponzo, Italian footballer (born 1972)
- 2013 – Mohamed Yousri Salama, Egyptian dentist and politician (born 1974)
- 2013 – Francis Hovell-Thurlow-Cumming-Bruce, 8th Baron Thurlow, English diplomat (born 1912)
- 2014 – Oleksandr Muzychko, Ukrainian activist (born 1962)
- 2014 – John Rowe Townsend, English author and scholar (born 1922)
- 2014 – David A. Trampier, American illustrator (born 1954)
- 2015 – Yehuda Avner, English-Israeli diplomat (born 1928)
- 2015 – notable deaths of the Germanwings Flight 9525 crash:
  - Oleg Bryjak, Kazakhstani-German opera singer (born 1960)
  - Maria Radner, German opera singer (born 1981)
- 2016 – Johan Cruyff, Dutch footballer (born 1947)
- 2016 – Garry Shandling, American comedian, actor, and screenwriter (born 1949)
- 2018 – Lys Assia, Swiss singer and First Winner of the Eurovision Song Contest (born 1924)
- 2018 – Rim Banna, Palestinian singer, composer, arranger and activist (born 1966)
- 2019 – Joseph Pilato, American film and voice actor (born 1949)
- 2020 – Albert Uderzo, French comic book artist (born 1927)
- 2020 – Manu Dibango, Cameroonian musician and songwriter (born 1933)
- 2021 – Jessica Walter, American actress and voice artist (born 1941)
- 2022 – Dagny Carlsson, Swedish blogger and influencer (born 1912)
- 2023 – Gordon Moore, American businessman, engineer and co-founder of Intel Corporation (born 1929)
- 2023 – Pradeep Sarkar, Indian writer and director (born 1955)
- 2024 – Lou Whittaker, American mountaineer, mountain guide, and businessman (born 1929)
- 2025 – Dick Carlson, American journalist and diplomat (born 1941)
- 2026 – Biruté Galdikas, Canadian primatologist and conservationist (born 1946)
- 2026 – Tracy Kidder, American writer (born 1945)
- 2026 – Mel Schilling, Australian TV personality and coach (born 1972)

== Holidays and observances ==
- Christian feast day:
  - Catherine of Vadstena
  - Hildelith of Barking
  - Mac Cairthinn of Clogher
  - Maria Karłowska
  - Óscar Romero (Catholic Church, Anglican Communion, Lutheranism)
  - Paul Couturier (Church of England)
  - Walter Hilton (Church of England)
  - March 24 (Eastern Orthodox liturgics)
- Day of Remembrance for Truth and Justice (Argentina)
- International Day for the Right to the Truth Concerning Gross Human Rights Violations and for the Dignity of Victims
- National Tree Planting Day (Uganda)
- World Tuberculosis Day (International)
