= Patient registration =

Aligns 3D medical imaging with patient's position

Patient registration is used to correlate the reference position of a virtual 3D dataset gathered by computer medical imaging with the reference position of the patient. This procedure is crucial in computer assisted surgery, in order to insure the reproducitibility of the preoperative registration and the clinical situation during surgery. The use of the term "patient registration" out of this context can lead to a confusion with the procedure of registering a patient into the files of a medical institution.

In computer assisted surgery, the first step is to gather a 3D dataset that reproduces with great accuracy the geometry of the normal and pathological tissues in the region that has to be operated on. This is mainly obtained by using CT or MRI scans of that region. The role of patient registration is to obtain a close-to-ideal reference reproducibility of the dataset – in order to correlate the position (offset) of the gathered dataset with the patient's position during the surgical intervention. Patient registration (1) eliminates the necessity of maintaining the same strict position of the patient during both preoperative scanning and surgery, and (2) provides the surgical robot the necessary reference information to act accurately on the patient, even if he has (been) moved during the intervention.

== Application ==
Patient registration was used mostly in head surgery – oral and maxillofacial surgery, neurosurgery, otolaryngology. With the advent of marker- and markerless-registration, the concept has been extended for abdominal surgery.

=== Using headframes ===
The first attempts in 3D mapping of human tissues were made by V. Horsley and R. Clarke in 1906. They have built a rectangular stereotactic headframe that had to be fixed to the head. It was based on cartesian principles and allowed them to accurately and reproductibly guide needle-like electrodes for neurophysiological experiments. They have experimented animals and were able to contribute to the mapping of the cerebellum. Improved versions of the Horsley–Clarke apparatus are still in used today in experimental neurosurgery.

The first stereotactic device for humans was also developed in neurosurgery, by E. Spiegel and H. Wycis in 1947. It was used for surgical treatment of Parkinson's disease and, during time, its applicability was extended for the surgical treatment of tumors, vascular malformations, functional neurosurgery etc. The system was based both on headframes and X-ray images taken for all three planes of space.

Further development of stereotactic surgery was made by Brown, Roberts and Wells in 1980. They have developed a halo ring that was applied on the skull, during a CT scan and neurosurgical interventions. This method provided improved surgical guidance and was in fact the first development of computer guided surgery.

Patient registration for the head area has developed for nearly two decades on the same principle of combining CT scans with mechanical reference devices such as headframes or halo rings. But the clinical experience showed that headgear is very uncomfortable to wear and even impossible to apply on little children, because their lack of cooperation; furthermore, the headframes can create artifacts in preoperative data gathering, or during surgery.

=== Reference markers ===
==== Skin ====
In 1986, a different approach was developed by Roberts und Strohbehn. They have used as landmarks several markers on the patient's skin both preoperative CT registration, and intraoperatively. This was a new current of the time in patient registration. Still, the method is time-consuming, and the exact reproducitibility of the marker positions is questionable.

==== Bone ====
The bony structures can provide a much better stability and reproducibility of the landmarks for patient registration. Based on this concept, a further technique was used: to implant temporary markers into bone structures that are superficial to the skin, under local anestesia. This was also combined with surface markers and CT registration. The technique has the disadvantage of a further minimal surgical procedure of placing the bone implants, with some risk of infection for the patient.

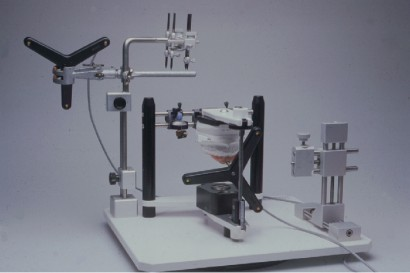
Surgical planning using bone segment navigation for the osteotomy of the jaw bones, based on models fixed into an articulator (registration based on infrared devices)

==== Dental splint markers ====
Dental splints have been traditionally used for transferring and reproducing 3D reference landmarks for positioning cast models in articulators – in dental prosthetics, orthodontics and orthognathic surgery. By applying several infrared markers on the splints and using an infrared camera, a better registration was obtained.

=== Markerless patient registration ===
==== Anatomical landmarks ====
The first attempts, based on the identification of anatomical landmarks were made by Caversaccio and Zulliger. The method was based on identifying certain antropometrical points and other anatomical landmarks on the skull, in correlation with the CT registration. But the landmarks cannot be exactly pointed out and reproduced during patient dataset registration and surgery, therefore the method is not precise enough.

==== Surface registration ====
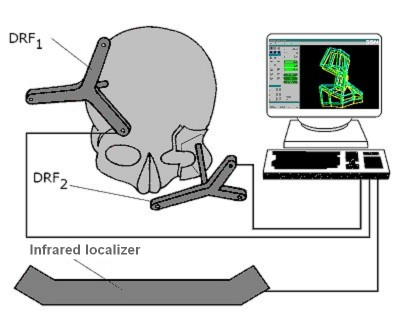
Schematic representation of the SSN system

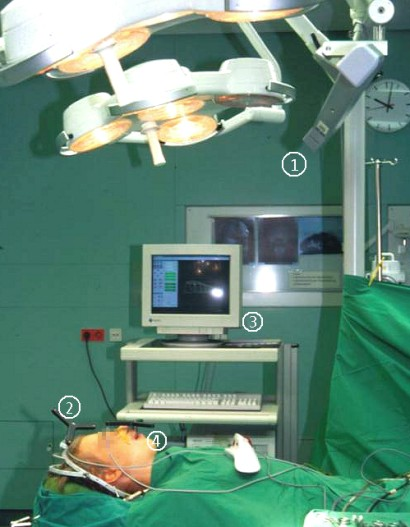
Actual usage of the SSN system in the operating room

Since 1998, new procedures have been developed by Marmulla and co-workers, using a different approach to the problem. Both during CT dataset gathering and surgical intervention, the patient registration was made by registering complete areas and surfaces, instead of distinctive surface markers. This was achieved by using laser scanners and a small guiding transmitter. The precision of the patient registration was significantly improved with this method.

Based on this concept, several registration and navigation systems were built by the same team. The Surgical Segment Navigator (SSN and SSN++) is such a system, developed for the first time for oral and maxillofacial surgery. This system correlates three different coordinate sets: CT data set, surface laser scan data set and the dataset produced by a small guiding transmitter, placed on the patient's head. The Laboratory Unit for Computer-Assisted Surgery (LUCAS) is used for planning surgery in the laboratory. This technological and surgical advance has permitted the elimination of mechanical guidance systems and improved the accuracy of the determinations, and thus the surgical act.

A research group at Ryerson University (now Toronto Metropolitan University) developed a method to use optical topographical imaging (OTI) to create a 3D model of the surface of open surgical sites and perform surface registration to CT and MRI data sets for neurosurgical navigation. The OTI technology is being licensed by 7D Surgical for their navigation platform.
