= Laboratory Unit for Computer Assisted Surgery =

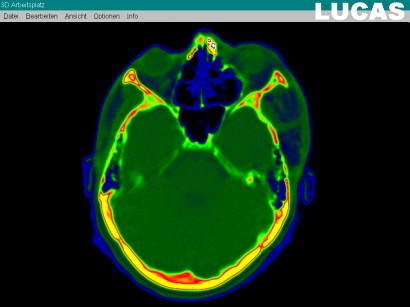
- Data gathering, based on CT "slices"
- Other names: LUCAS

Laboratory Unit for Computer Assisted Surgery is a system used for virtual surgical planning. Starting in 1998, LUCAS was developed at the University of Regensburg, Germany, with the support of the Carl Zeiss Company. The resulting surgical planning is then reproduced onto the patient by using a navigation system. LUCAS is integrated into the same platform together with the surgical segment navigator (SSN), the Surgical Tool Navigator (STN), the Surgical Microscope Navigator (SMN) and the 6DOF Manipulator (or, in German, "Mehrkoordinatenmanipulator" - MKM), also from the Carl Zeiss Company.

== Workflow ==
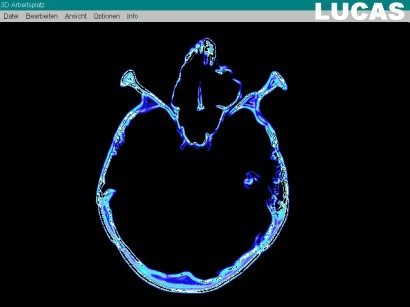
Obtained from the CT "slices"

Data from separate bidimensional slices generated by a CT or MRI scan are uploaded into the LUCAS system. The resulting dataset is then processed, in order to eliminate image noise, and to enhance the anatomical contours and also the general contrast of the images. The next step is to create a virtual 3D model from the gathered collection of 2D images. The bone segment that is to be repositioned is marked, on the 3D grid reconstructed model; then, the actual repositioning of that bone segment is done on the virtual model, until the optimal anatomical position is obtained. The criteria for the optimal position of the bone segment are: symmetry with the opposite side, the continuity of the normal bone contours, or the normal volume of an anatomical region (such as the orbit. Afterwards, a textured final image is rendered. The calculated vectors for the bone segment repositioning, together with the whole virtual model are finally transferred to the surgical segment navigator.
