= Surgical planning =

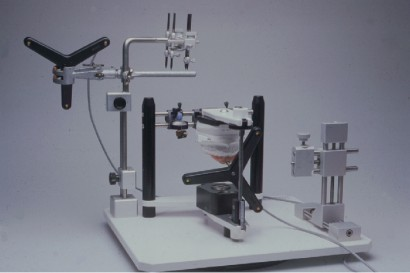
Surgical planning using bone segment navigation for the osteotomy of the jaw bones, based on models fixed into an articulator (registration based on infrared devices)

Surgical planning is the preoperative method of pre-visualising a surgical intervention, in order to predefine the surgical steps and furthermore the bone segment navigation in the context of computer-assisted surgery. The surgical planning is most important in neurosurgery and oral and maxillofacial surgery. The transfer of the surgical planning to the patient is generally made using a medical navigation system.

== Principles of surgical planning ==
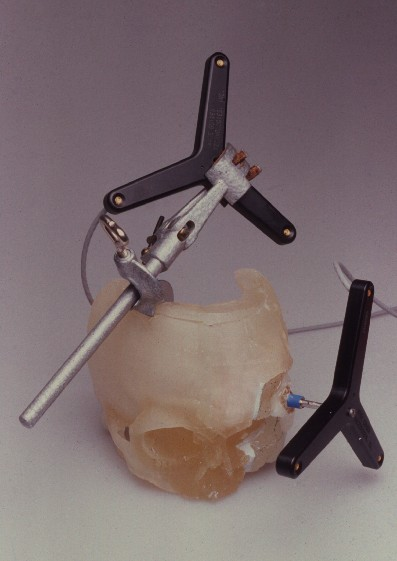
Surgical planning using bone segment navigation for the osteotomy of the left orbit, based on stereolithographic models (registration based on infrared devices)

The imagistic dataset used for surgical planning is mainly based on a CT or MRI. In oral and maxillofacial surgery, a different, more "traditional" surgical planning can be used for orthognatic surgery, based on cast models fixed into an articulator.

== History of the concept ==
In order to make a surgical planning, one would need a 3D image of the patient. The starting point was made by G. Hounsfield in the 1970s, by using CT in order to record data about the anatomical situation of the patients. In the 1980s, advances were made by the radiologist M. Vannier and his team, by creating the first computed three-dimensional reconstruction from a CT dataset. In the early 1990s, the surgical planning was performed by using stereolithographic models. During the late 1990s, the first full computer-based virtual surgical planning was made for osteotomies, and then transferred to the operating theatre by a navigation system. Currently 3D Printed models are also used to plan a procedure and improve patient outcomes.

The first commercially available neurosurgical planning systems appeared in the 1990s (the StealthStation by Medtronic, the VectorVision by Brainlab). As newer imaging modalities emerged providing increasing anatomical and functional detail for the patient in the 2000s, these surgical planning systems started to incorporate virtual reality technology to facilitate the visualisation and manipulation of the 3D data. One example of such systems is the Dextroscope, manufactured by Volume Interactions Pte Ltd. The Dextroscope is mostly used in the planning of complex neurosurgical procedures.
