= Rüdiger Marmulla =

German cranio-maxillofacial surgeon

Rüdiger Marmulla (born 19 December 1963, in Frankfurt am Main) is a German cranio-maxillofacial surgeon.

== Career ==
On 24 March, 1998, Rüdiger Marmulla performed the first computer-assisted bone segment navigation at the University of Regensburg, Germany. For this, a new navigation system was used which Marmulla developed in cooperation with Carl Zeiss. The Surgical Segment Navigator uses for the first time complete anatomical surfaces instead of single reference points for the patient registration process.

After his academic studies in human medicine and dentistry at the University of Frankfurt/Main, Rüdiger Marmulla received two doctorates as Dr. med. (MD) and Dr. med. dent. (DMD) in the field of electron-microscopic research at the Dr. Senckenbergische Anatomie. Later, Rüdiger Marmulla joined the medical branch of the Christian AIDS Help Facility in Frankfurt/Mainz.

From 1994 to 1998, Rüdiger Marmulla worked as resident in the clinic for oral and maxillofacial surgery at the University of Regensburg, as of 1998 he was senior physician. In 1999, Rüdiger Marmulla qualified as a professor with his thesis in computer-assisted bone segment navigation. Since 1995, Rüdiger Marmulla acts as consultant for Carl Zeiss AG and since 2005 as consultant for Fraunhofer Institute IPK, Berlin.

From 2002 on he led a special research field funded by the German Research Foundation for computer-supported surgery at the University of Heidelberg and the University of Karlsruhe. Since 2005, Rüdiger Marmulla had, among others, a joint research and development project for navigation with the German Aerospace Center (Deutsches Zentrum für Luft- und Raumfahrt, DLR).

== Monographs ==
- Time Scheduling Professional. Jungjohann Publishing house, Neckarsulm 1997, ISBN 3-931253-12-0.
- Comprehensive Patient Administrator. 2nd ed. Jungjohann Publishing house, Neckarsulm 2003, ISBN 3-932347-18-8.
- with Michael Dieterich: Church in Progress. 1st ed. IPP Publishing house, Freudenstadt 2015, ISBN 978-3-943815-05-4.

== Patents ==
- Marmulla, Rüdiger (inventor), Carl Zeiss Oberkochen (submitter): Bone Segment Navigation System, International Patent PCT/EP98/06828, 1998
- Marmulla, Rüdiger (inventor), Carl Zeiss Oberkochen (submitter): Bone Segment Navigation system, European Patent EP/98954456, 1999
- Marmulla, Rüdiger System and method for bone segment navigation, United States Patent 6.241.735, 2001
- Marmulla, Rüdiger (inventor), Carl Zeiss (submitter): System and method for bone segment navigation, Japanese Patent 1999-523260, 2002
- Marmulla, Rüdiger and Lüth, Tim: Device for instrument, bone segment, tissue, and organ navigation, European Patent 1237493, 2004
- Marmulla, Rüdiger and Lüth, Tim: Method and device for instrument, bone segment, tissue, and organ navigation, United States Patent 7.079.885, 2006
