= Computer-assisted surgery =

- ICD-9-CM: 00.3

Computer-assisted surgery (CAS) represents a surgical concept and set of methods, that use computer technology for surgical planning, and for guiding or performing surgical interventions. CAS is also known as computer-aided surgery, computer-assisted intervention, image-guided surgery, digital surgery and surgical navigation, but these are terms that are more or less synonymous with CAS. CAS has been a leading factor in the development of robotic surgery.

== General principles ==
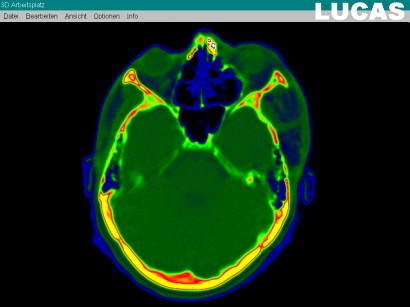
Image gathering ("segmentation") on the LUCAS workstation

=== Creating a virtual image of the patient ===
The most important component for CAS is the development of an accurate model of the patient. This can be conducted through a number of medical imaging technologies including CT, MRI, x-rays, ultrasound plus many more. For the generation of this model, the anatomical region to be operated has to be scanned and uploaded into the computer system. It is possible to employ a number of scanning methods, with the datasets combined through data fusion techniques. The final objective is the creation of a 3D dataset that reproduces the exact geometrical situation of the normal and pathological tissues and structures of that region. Of the available scanning methods, the CT is preferred, because MRI data sets are known to have volumetric deformations that may lead to inaccuracies. An example data set can include the collection of data compiled with 180 CT slices, that are 1 mm apart, each having 512 by 512 pixels. The contrasts of the 3D dataset (with its tens of millions of pixels) provide the detail of soft vs hard tissue structures, and thus allow a computer to differentiate, and visually separate for a human, the different tissues and structures. The image data taken from a patient will often include intentional landmark features, in order to be able to later realign the virtual dataset against the actual patient during surgery. See patient registration.

=== Image analysis and processing ===
Image analysis involves the manipulation of the patients 3D model to extract relevant information from the data. Using the differing contrast levels of the different tissues within the imagery, as examples, a model can be changed to show just hard structures such as bone, or view the flow of arteries and veins through the brain.

=== Diagnostic, preoperative planning, surgical simulation ===
Using specialized software the gathered dataset can be rendered as a virtual 3D model of the patient, this model can be easily manipulated by a surgeon to provide views from any angle and at any depth within the volume. Thus the surgeon can better assess the case and establish a more accurate diagnostic. Furthermore, the surgical intervention will be planned and simulated virtually, before actual surgery takes place (computer-aided surgical simulation [CASS]). Using dedicated software, the surgical robot will be programmed to carry out the planned actions during the actual surgical intervention.

=== Surgical navigation ===
In computer-assisted surgery, the actual intervention is defined as surgical navigation. Using the surgical navigation system the surgeon uses special instruments, which are tracked by the navigation system. The position of a tracked instrument in relation to the patient's anatomy is shown on images of the patient, as the surgeon moves the instrument. The surgeon thus uses the system to 'navigate' the location of an instrument. The feedback the system provides of the instrument location is particularly useful in situations where the surgeon cannot actually see the tip of the instrument, such as in minimally invasive surgeries.

=== Robotic surgery ===
Robotic surgery is a term used for correlated actions of a surgeon and a surgical robot (that has been programmed to carry out certain actions during the preoperative planning procedure). A surgical robot is a mechanical device (generally looking like a robotic arm) that is computer-controlled. Robotic surgery can be divided into three types, depending on the degree of surgeon interaction during the procedure: supervisory-controlled, telesurgical, and shared-control. In a supervisory-controlled system, the procedure is executed solely by the robot, which will perform the pre-programmed actions. A telesurgical system, also known as remote surgery, requires the surgeon to manipulate the robotic arms during the procedure rather than allowing the robotic arms to work from a predetermined program. With shared-control systems, the surgeon carries out the procedure with the use of a robot that offers steady-hand manipulations of the instrument. In most robots, the working mode can be chosen for each separate intervention, depending on the surgical complexity and the particularities of the case.

== Applications ==
Computer-assisted surgery is the beginning of a revolution in surgery. It already makes a great difference in high-precision surgical domains, but it is also used in standard surgical procedures.

=== Computer-assisted neurosurgery ===
Telemanipulators have been used for the first time in neurosurgery, in the 1980s. This allowed a greater development in brain microsurgery (compensating surgeon's physiological tremor by 10-fold), increased accuracy and precision of the intervention. It also opened a new gate to minimally invasive brain surgery, furthermore reducing the risk of post-surgical morbidity by avoiding accidental damage to adjacent centers.

Computer-assisted neurosurgery also includes spinal procedures using navigation and robotics systems. Current navigation systems available include Medtronic StealthStation, BrainLab, 7D Surgical, Stryker, and Zeta Surgical Zeta; current robotics systems available include Mazor Renaissance, MazorX, Globus Excelsius GPS, and Brainlab Cirq.

=== Computer-assisted oral and maxillofacial surgery ===
Bone segment navigation is the modern surgical approach in orthognathic surgery (correction of the anomalies of the jaws and skull), in temporo-mandibular joint (TMJ) surgery, or in the reconstruction of the mid-face and orbit.

It is also used in implantology where the available bone can be seen and the position, angulation and depth of the implants can be simulated before the surgery. During the operation surgeon is guided visually and by sound alerts. IGI (Image Guided Implantology) is one of the navigation systems which uses this technology.

==== Computer Assisted Implant Surgery (CAIS) ====
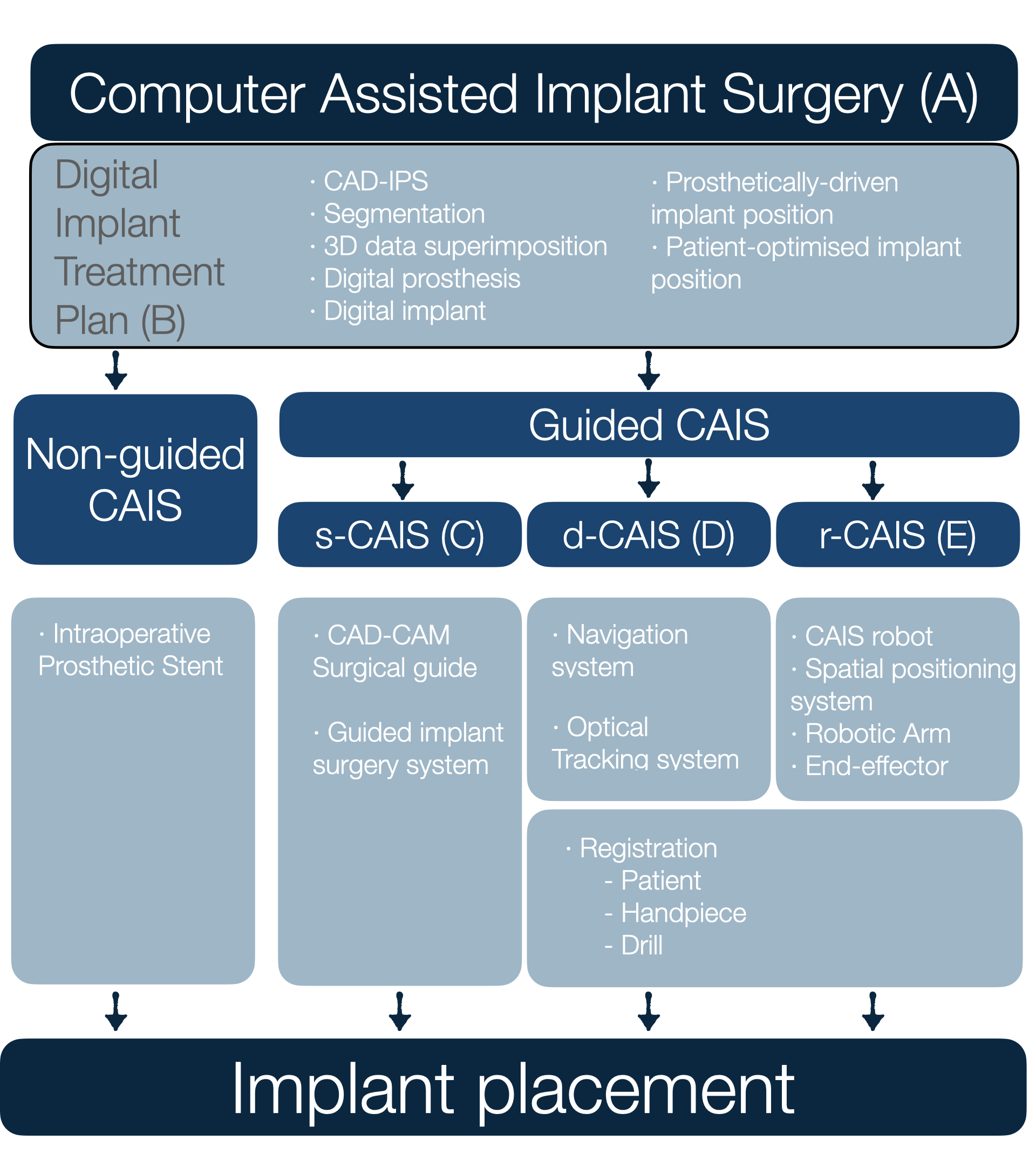
Organisation of technologies for Computer Assisted Implant Surgery, based on the 2025 Classification by Garcia et al.

New therapeutic concepts as guided surgery are being developed and applied in the placement of dental implants. Recently, the different approaches for guided surgery in the field of Oral Implantology were classified under the wider term "Computer Assisted Implant Surgery" (CAIS). CAIS requires the digital treatment plan of the individual patient and thereafter static, dynamic and robotic technologies can be utilised for the guided implant placement. Static utilises prefabricated guides to direct osteotomy and implant placement, dynamic is based or real time tracking of the drills position through optical technology while robotic CAIS includes implant placement by collaborative of task-autonomous robotic arm. Seven robotic CAIS systems are currently commercially available in different regions of the world, originating from China or USA. Most utilise optical tracking technology for spatial positioning, while both collaborative and task-autonomous directions are actively being pursued by developers Although robotic CAIS is shown to achieve higher trueness of implant placement in meta-analysis of clinical trials, several drawbacks related to cost/effectiveness and overall efficiency prevent at present wide implementation of such systems in mainstream clinical practice.

Hybrid approaches, where static and dynamic CAIS were combined in the same surgery have been reported to achieve marginally higher accuracy than this achieved by either static or dynamic alone. Nevertheless, this has been achieved under research settings and its implementation in mainstream clinical practice might be not feasible due to increased costs and complexity.

The prosthetic rehabilitation is also planned and performed parallel to the surgical procedures. The planning steps are at the foreground and carried out in a cooperation of the surgeon, the dentist and the dental technician. Edentulous patients, either one or both jaws, benefit as the time of treatment is reduced.

Regarding the edentulous patients, conventional denture support is often compromised due to moderate bone atrophy, even if the dentures are constructed based on correct anatomic morphology.

Using cone beam computed tomography, the patient and the existing prosthesis are being scanned. Furthermore, the prosthesis alone is also scanned. Glass pearls of defined diameter are placed in the prosthesis and used as reference points for the upcoming planning. The resulting data is processed and the position of the implants determined. The surgeon, using special developed software, plans the implants based on prosthetic concepts considering the anatomic morphology. After the planning of the surgical part is completed, a CAD/CAM surgical guide for dental placement is constructed. The mucosal-supported surgical splint ensures the exact placement of the implants in the patient. Parallel to this step, the new implant supported prosthesis is constructed.

The dental technician, using the data resulting from the previous scans, manufactures a model representing the situation after the implant placement. The prosthetic compounds, abutments, are already prefabricated. The length and the inclination can be chosen. The abutments are connected to the model at a position in consideration of the prosthetic situation. The exact position of the abutments is registered. The dental technician can now manufacture the prosthesis.

The fit of the surgical guide is clinically proved. After that, the surgical guide is attached using a three-point support pin system. Prior to the attachment, irrigation with a chemical disinfectant is advised. The pins are driven through defined sheaths from the vestibular to the oral side of the jaw. Ligaments anatomy should be considered, and if necessary decompensation can be achieved with minimal surgical interventions. The proper fit of the template is crucial and should be maintained throughout the whole treatment. Regardless of the mucosal resilience, a correct and stable attachment is achieved through the bone fixation. The access to the jaw can now only be achieved through the sleeves embedded in the surgical template. Using specific burs through the sleeves the mucosa is removed. Every bur used, carries a sleeve compatible to the sleeves in the template, which ensures that the final position is achieved but no further progress in the alveolar ridge can take place. Further procedure is very similar to the traditional implant placement. The pilot hole is drilled and then expanded. With the aid of the splint, the implants are finally placed. After that, the splint can be removed.

With the aid of a registration template, the abutments can be attached and connected to the implants at the defined position. No less than a pair of abutments should be connected simultaneously to avoid any discrepancy. An important advantage of this technique is the parallel positioning of the abutments. A radiological control is necessary to verify the correct placement and connection of implant and abutment.

In a further step, abutments are covered by gold cone caps, which represent the secondary crowns. Where necessary, the transition of the gold cone caps to the mucosa can be isolated with rubber dam rings.

The new prosthesis corresponds to a conventional total prosthesis but the basis contains cavities so that the secondary crowns can be incorporated. The prosthesis is controlled at the terminal position and corrected if needed. The cavities are filled with a self-curing cement and the prosthesis is placed in the terminal position. After the self-curing process, the gold caps are definitely cemented in the prosthesis cavities and the prosthesis can now be detached. Excess cement may be removed and some corrections like polishing or under filling around the secondary crowns may be necessary. The new prosthesis is fitted using a construction of telescope double cone crowns. At the end position, the prosthesis buttons down on the abutments to ensure an adequate hold.

At the same sitting, the patient receives the implants and the prosthesis. An interim prosthesis is not necessary. The extent of the surgery is kept to minimum. Due to the application of the splint, a reflection of soft tissues in not needed. The patient experiences less bleeding, swelling and discomfort. Complications such as injuring of neighbouring structures are also avoided. Using 3D imaging during the planning phase, the communication between the surgeon, dentist and dental technician is highly supported and any problems can easily detected and eliminated. Each specialist accompanies the whole treatment and interaction can be made. As the end result is already planned and all surgical intervention is carried according to the initial plan, the possibility of any deviation is kept to a minimum. Given the effectiveness of the initial planning the whole treatment duration is shorter than any other treatment procedures.

=== Computer-assisted ENT surgery ===
Image-guided surgery and CAS in ENT commonly consists of navigating preoperative image data such as CT or cone beam CT to assist with locating or avoiding anatomically important structures such as the optic nerve or the opening to the frontal sinus. For use in middle-ear surgery there has been some application of robotic surgery due to the requirement for high-precision actions.

=== Computer-assisted orthopedic surgery (CAOS) ===
The application of robotic surgery is widespread in orthopedics, especially in routine interventions, like total hip replacement or pedicle screw insertion during spinal fusion. It is also useful in pre-planning and guiding the correct anatomical position of displaced bone fragments in fractures, allowing a good fixation by osteosynthesis, especially for malrotated bones. Early CAOS systems include the HipNav, OrthoPilot, and Praxim. Recently, mini-optical navigation tools called Intellijoint HIP have been developed for hip arthroplasty procedures.

=== Computer-assisted visceral surgery ===
With the advent of computer-assisted surgery, great progresses have been made in general surgery towards minimal invasive approaches. Laparoscopy in abdominal and gynecologic surgery is one of the beneficiaries, allowing surgical robots to perform routine operations, like cholecystectomies, or even hysterectomies. In cardiac surgery, shared control systems can perform mitral valve replacement or ventricular pacing by small thoracotomies. In urology, surgical robots contributed in laparoscopic approaches for pyeloplasty or nephrectomy or prostatic interventions.

=== Computer-assisted cardiac interventions ===
Applications include atrial fibrillation and cardiac resynchronization therapy. Pre-operative MRI or CT is used to plan the procedure. Pre-operative images, models or planning information can be registered to intra-operative fluoroscopic image to guide procedures.

=== Computer-assisted radiosurgery ===
Radiosurgery is also incorporating advanced robotic systems. CyberKnife is such a system that has a lightweight linear accelerator mounted on the robotic arm. It is guided towards tumor processes, using the skeletal structures as a reference system (Stereotactic Radiosurgery System). During the procedure, real time X-ray is used to accurately position the device before delivering radiation beam. The robot can compensate for respiratory motion of the tumor in real-time.

== Advantages ==
CAS starts with the premise of a much better visualization of the operative field, thus allowing a more accurate preoperative diagnostic and a well-defined surgical planning, by using surgical planning in a preoperative virtual environment. This way, the surgeon can easily assess most of the surgical difficulties and risks and have a clear idea about how to optimize the surgical approach and decrease surgical morbidity. During the operation, the computer guidance improves the geometrical accuracy of the surgical gestures and also reduce the redundancy of the surgeon's acts. This significantly improves ergonomy in the operating theatre, decreases the risk of surgical errors, reduces the operating time and improves the surgical outcome.

== Disadvantages ==
There are several disadvantages of computer-assisted surgery. Many systems have costs in the millions of dollars, making them a large investment for even big hospitals. Some people believe that improvements in technology, such as haptic feedback, increased processor speeds, and more complex and capable software will increase the cost of these systems. Another disadvantage is the size of the systems. These systems have relatively large footprints. This is an important disadvantage in today's already-crowded operating rooms. It may be difficult for both the surgical team and the robot to fit into the operating room.

== See also ==
- Advanced Simulation Library is a hardware accelerated multiphysics simulation software
