= Zeta Surgical =

American medical technology company

ZETA SURGICAL
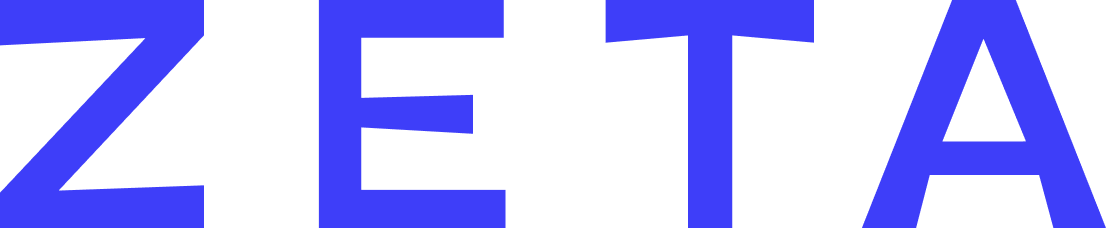
- Company type: Private
- Industry: Medical devices
- Founded: 2018
- Founders: Jose Amich (CEO), Raahil Sha (CTO), William Gormley
- Headquarters: Boston, Massachusetts, United States
- Products: Surgical navigation
- Website: https://zetasurgical.com

Zeta Surgical Inc. is a privately held American medical technology company based in Boston, Massachusetts. The company develops computer-assisted surgery systems for neurosurgery and interventional neuroradiology. The company was founded in 2018 by Harvard University graduates Jose Amich and Raahil Sha, along with Brigham and Women's Hospital neurosurgeon William Gormley.

== Technology ==
ZETA SURGICAL's technology employs computer vision and artificial intelligence algorithms for real-time surgical navigation. The company's approach utilizes parallel computing for image registration and patient tracking without rigid head fixation. Preclinical and clinical studies have evaluated the system's ability to maintain submillimeter accuracy in applications such as neurotrauma, intracerebral hemorrhage, brain biopsy and transcranial magnetic stimulation.

The company's primary product, ZETA, has been described as a "GPS-like" system for neurosurgery. It received its first 510(k) clearance from the US Food and Drug Administration for use in cranial surgical procedures in September 2023, followed by subsequent clearances in 2024 that expanded its indications and instrument compatibility. ZETA also received FDA clearance for the Zeta TMS Navigation System, enabling submillimeter navigated transcranial magnetic stimulation procedures. In 2024, ZETA SURGICAL reported the completion of its first multi-center trial at Singapore General Hospital and Tan Tock Seng Hospital. ZETA received an iF Design Award and a Good Design Award in 2023. The company is partnered with Australian product design and consultancy firm Design + Industry.

In 2022, ZETA SURGICAL announced that it was developing a Focused ultrasound for intracranial drug delivery system, navigated by ZETA. The company is a member of the Focused Ultrasound Foundation.

== History ==
ZETA SURGICAL was started by Jose Amich and Raahil Sha while studying as undergraduate students at Harvard University, together with Harvard Medical School professor William Gormley, also a neurosurgeon at the Brigham and Women's Hospital. Jose Amich and William Gormley are alumni of the MIT Sloan School of Management MBA program. The company has raised funding from notable investors such as Y Combinator, Artesian Hostplus VC, Innospark Ventures, Trevor Fetter, Gabriel Hammond and Marc de Garidel. Company advisors include Elad Levy and George Bickerstaff (former Chief Financial Officer of Novartis Pharma AG).

Raahil Sha was named one of Harvard's Most Interesting Seniors. Together with Jose Amich, they have been recognized on the North American Forbes 30 Under 30 2024 list.
