= HipNav =

HipNav was the first computer-assisted surgery system developed to guide the surgeon during total hip replacement surgery. It was developed at Carnegie Mellon University. The patented technology was licensed out of Carnegie Mellon by the founders of CASurgica, Inc. After several years of attempting to commercialize HipNav, the company ultimately folded. The founders of CASurgica later founded Blue Belt Technologies, Inc.
