= Brainlab =

German medical technology company

Brainlab SE

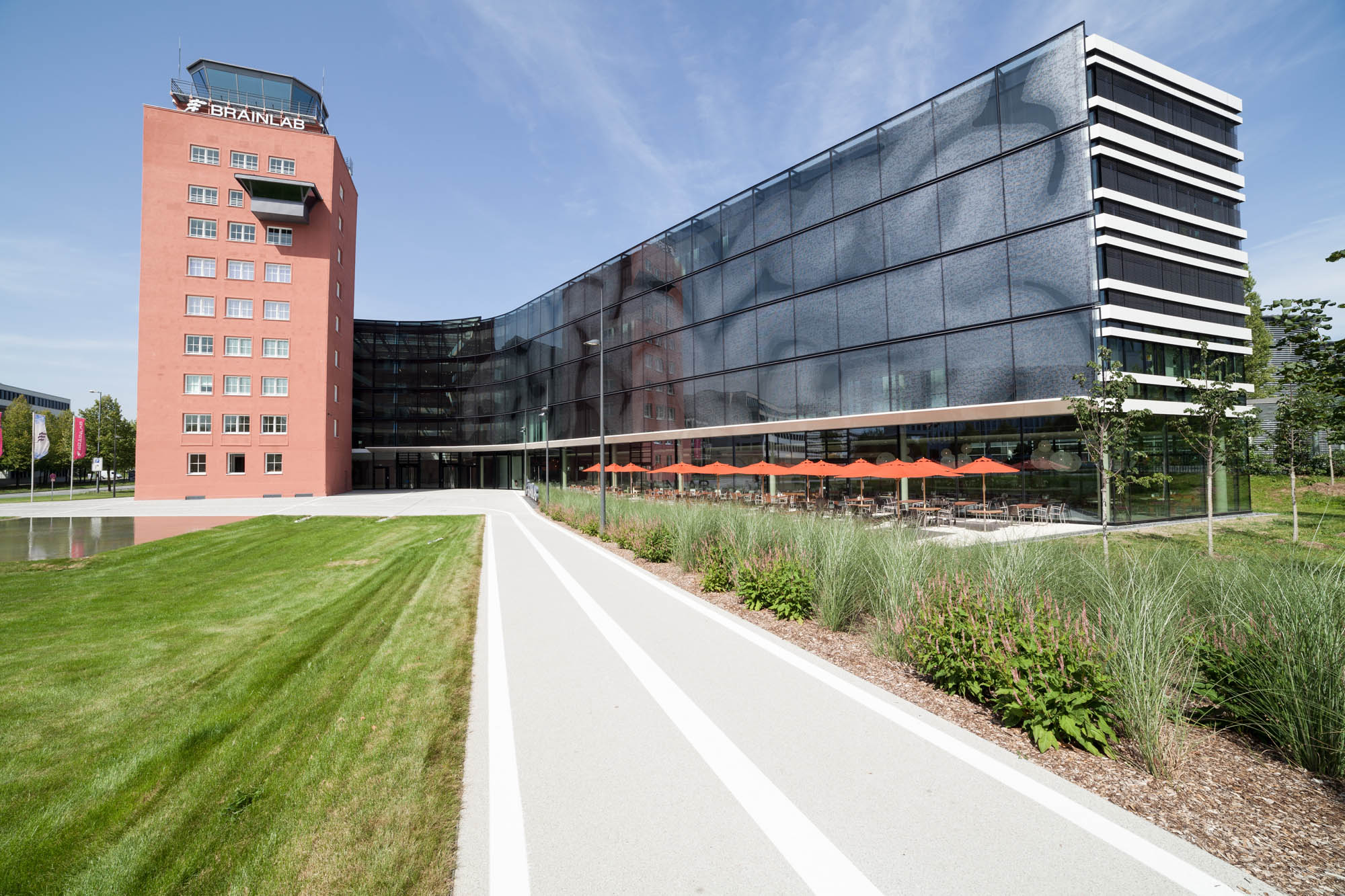
- Brainlab Headquarter in Munich, Riem
- Type: SE
- Industry: Medical technology
- Founded: 1989 in Munich, Germany
- Founder: Stefan Vilsmeier
- Headquarters: Munich, Germany
- Number of locations: 23 (2025)
- Area served: Worldwide
- Key people: Managing Directors: Rainer Birkenbach, Tobias Schalkhaußer, Florian Hoffmann, Rudolf Kreitmair
- Products: Medical technology for image-guided surgery, radiation oncology and medical image exchange
- Brands: Buzz and Buzz Virtual, Node, Kick and Kick EM, Curve, Loop-X, Cirq, Robotic Suite, Mixed Reality and Mixed Reality Viewer, Novalis, ExacTrac Dynamic and ExacTrac Dynamic Surface, Elements
- Revenue: €429.2 million (2022/23)
- Number of employees: 2063 (2026)
- Subsidiaries: medPhoton, Langer Medical
- Website: brainlab.com

Brainlab is a privately held German medical technology company headquartered in Munich, Bavaria. Brainlab develops software and hardware for radiotherapy and radiosurgery, and the surgical fields of neurosurgery, ENT and craniomaxillofacial, spine surgery, and traumatic interventions. Their products focus on image-guided surgery and radiosurgery, digital operating room integration technologies, and cloud-based data sharing. Brainlab is featured in the German media on topics such as the digitalisation of healthcare data and artificial intelligence in healthcare.

== History ==
Brainlab was founded in Munich in 1989 by Stefan Vilsmeier. The first Brainlab product was a mouse-controlled, menu-driven surgical planning and navigation software, introduced in 1990 at the University of Vienna and exhibited at the Congress of Neurological Surgeons (CNS) Annual Scientific Meeting in Washington, D.C. in 1992.

In 1993, Brainlab developed a linear accelerator-based system for stereotactic radiosurgery using micromultileaf collimators. Three years later, Brainlab entered into a partnership with Varian, Inc., which resulted in a long-term collaboration in the field of radiosurgery.

Brainlab expanded into the field of image-guided surgery in 1997 and was the first to develop passive marker technology. In the same year, Brainlab introduced its first shaped-beam radiosurgery system, Novalis. Lance Armstrong, a professional cyclist and testicular cancer survivor, was the spokesperson for the Novalis brand during the early 2000s.

In 2007, the company released Novalis Tx Radiosurgery, a radiotherapy system jointly created by Brainlab and Varian Medical Systems, Inc. The same year, Brainlab collaborated with Siemens Medical Solutions to launch an intraoperative CT machine utilizing a rail-mounted scanner. In 2008, Digital Lightbox was brought to the market, allowing digital patient images to be viewed and adjusted in the operating room. Digital Lightbox was transformed into Buzz Digital O.R. in 2012.

In the following years, several Brainlab technologies and products received the Red Dot Design Award, including the Kick navigation system, the Curve technology and the Airo Mobile Intraoperative CT.

In March 2019, Smith & Nephew announced the acquisition of the orthopaedic joint reconstruction business unit from Brainlab to advance its efforts in robotic surgery. The same year, Brainlab recalled their spine and trauma 3D navigation software (version 1.0) because it could display inaccurate information during a procedure, which could prevent surgeons from accurately navigating surgical tools inside the patient.

On September 14, 2022, founder Stefan Vilsmeier and Brainlab VP for R&D Claus Promberger, together with clinical partner Professor Cordula Petersen, MD from the UKE (Universitätsklinikum Hamburg-Eppendorf) in Hamburg, were nominated as one of the three finalists for the Federal President’s Award for Innovation and Technology (Deutscher Zukunftspreis) 2022 for the ExacTrac Dynamic technology, a highly precise radiation treatment for tumors in motion. The prize has been awarded annually by the German Federal President for over 25 years and honours outstanding technical, engineering, scientific as well as software and algorithm-based achievements within Germany.

In cooperation with the City of Munich, Brainlab financed the Munich-Riem memorial site, which commemorates the 1970 terrorist attack at the former Munich-Riem Airport. Reasons for the commitment included the local proximity of the former airport to the Brainlab company headquarters and the promotion of art in Munich. Brainlab commissioned the artist Alicja Kwade to design an eight-metre-high sculpture made of steel and bronze for the memorial site.

In May 2022, Brainlab acquired MedPhoton GmbH, a robotic imaging solutions developer and manufacturer based in Austria specialized for image guided radiation therapy and surgery.

In 2023, Brainlab ran a course in neurosurgery in Tanzania and donated a surgical navigation system to the Muhimbili Orthopaedic Institute. This engagement is part of the Brainlab Social Program, a corporate social responsibility initiative by Brainlab.

== Company Structure ==
Brainlab converted from a public limited company (Aktiengesellschaft) to a European Stock Corporation (Societas Europaea, SE) in June 2025. Headquartered in Munich, Brainlab operates worldwide in the medical technology sector. The management team at Brainlab consists of Rainer Birkenbach, Chief Executive Officer (CEO), Florian Hoffmann, Chief Operating Officer (COO), Rudolf Kreitmair, Chief Financial Officer (CFO), and Tobias Schalkhaußer, Chief Marketing Officer (CMO). The Chairman of the Administrative Board is founder Stefan Vilsmeier.

In the 2022/2023 financial year, Brainlab AG generated nearly €429.2 million in revenue. As of 2026, the company has around 2063 employees.

== Headquarters ==
Brainlab was founded in the parental home of founder, Stefan Vilsmeier, in 1989. By 1991, Brainlab had moved into its first official headquarters in the Munich suburb of Poing. After a wave of new hires in 1995, a larger space was needed and headquarters moved to the Bavarian town of Heimstetten, Germany. In 2006, Brainlab constructed and moved into its headquarters in Feldkirchen, Germany, just outside Munich. Edmund Stoiber, former minister-president of Bavaria, officially opened the new building in 2007. In December 2016, Brainlab moved into a newly constructed headquarters in the Munich suburb of Riem on the grounds of the former Munich-Riem Airport. The headquarters also have a restaurant and a fitness studio. Featured speakers at the official inauguration ceremony on July 11, 2017, were the Bavarian State Minister Ilse Aigner and German Chancellor, Angela Merkel.

== Stefan Vilsmeier ==
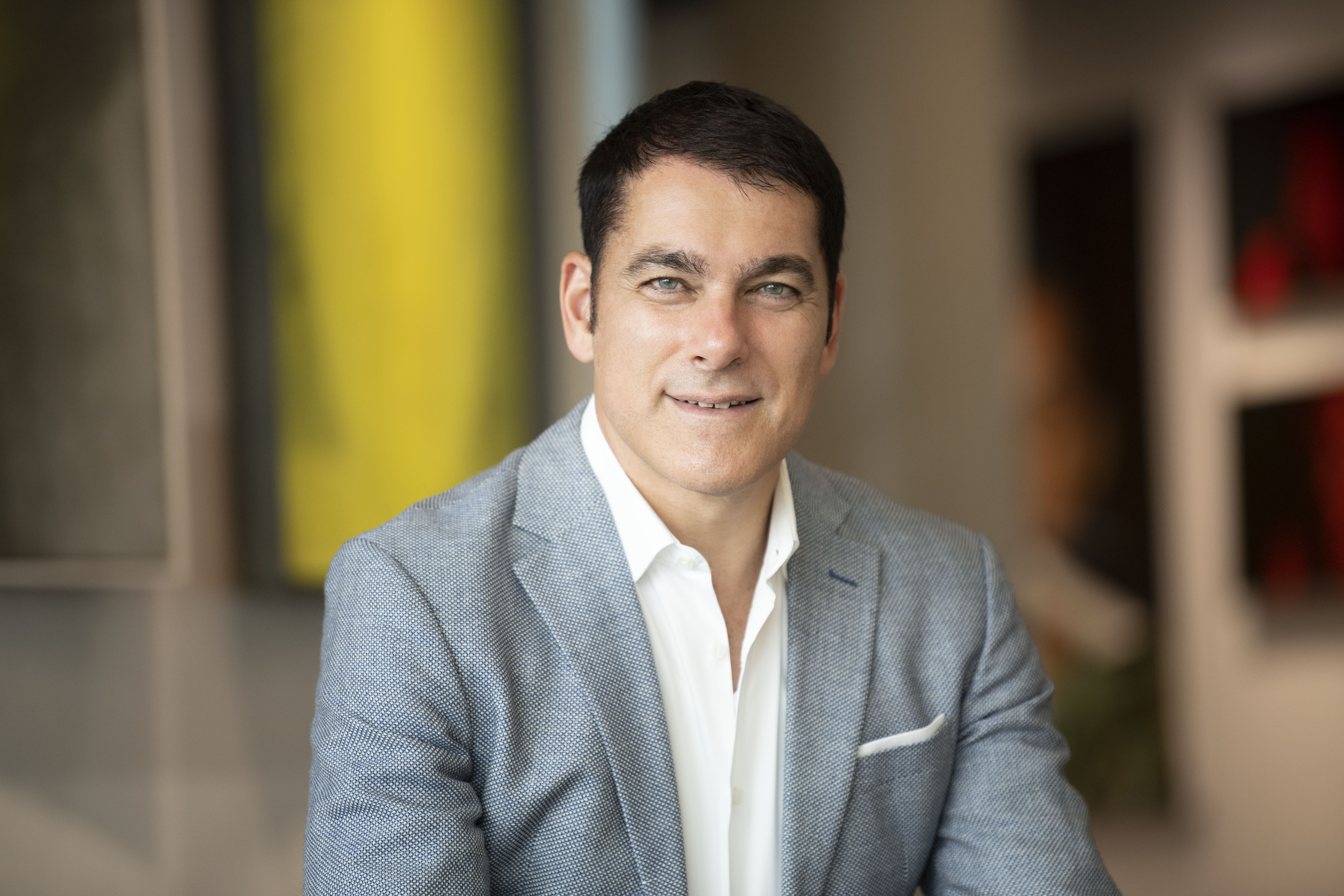
Stefan Vilsmeier, the company founder

Stefan Vilsmeier, a self-taught computer programmer, is a German entrepreneur, inventor, author, the founder of Brainlab, and CEO of Snke Holding SE.

In 2000, Vilsmeier became the youngest recipient of the Bavarian Order of Merit, presented to him by former Bavarian Minister-President, Edmund Stoiber. In 2001, Vilsmeier was awarded the national title of Entrepreneur of the Year in the category of Information Technology, by Ernst & Young. The following year, Ernst & Young awarded Vilsmeier with the title of World Entrepreneur of the Year at an awards event held in Monte Carlo. Also in 2002, the World Economic Forum (WEF) selected Vilsmeier as one of their Global Leaders for Tomorrow 2003. In 2014, Vilsmeier was awarded with the International Steven Hoogendijk Award from the Bataafsch Genootschap der Proefondervindelijke Wijsbegeerte for his service as a pioneer in the development of neuronavigation systems.

Vilsmeier writes and is a frequent interviewee in the German media on topics such as the digitalisation of healthcare data and artificial intelligence in the healthcare sector.

In 2025, after founding and leading Brainlab for 35 years, Vilsmeier transitioned to Chairman of the Administrative Board. He became CEO of Snke Holding SE, a pioneering healthtech company and former Brainlab subsidiary, in 2025.

== Subsidiaries, Acquisitions and Spin-Offs ==
Brainlab owns and collaborates with several subsidiaries.

In 2009, Brainlab began a partnership with Voyant Health, a Tel Aviv, Israel-based company founded in 2003, active in orthopaedic technology. In 2011, Brainlab acquired Voyant Health and renamed it Brainlab Israel.

Brainlab acquired Medineering, a developer for application-specific robotic technologies and surgery devices, in March 2019. Brainlab had previously been an investor and distribution partner of Medineering for nearly three years.

In 2020, Brainlab announced two additional acquisitions. The first, in January 2020, was VisionTree Software Inc., a San Diego-based company that develops cloud-based, patient-centric data collection and health management technologies.

The second acquisition, announced in June, was Level Ex, a Chicago-based medical video game maker. In 2020, Brainlab also founded its subsidiary Snke OS, a company with approximately 150 employees, aiming to create the first digital health technology platform for surgery.

In March 2021, Brainlab obtained the German company Mint Medical, which is based in Heidelberg and develops image reading and reporting software for clinical routine and research.

In May 2022, Brainlab announced the majority acquisition of Austria-based robotic and medical device developer and manufacturer MedPhoton. The acquisition came after a partnership in 2020 in the field of intraoperative imaging, which resulted in the launch of a mobile imaging robot (Loop-X). MedPhoton continued to operate as an independent research and development company within the Brainlab group. The same year, Brainlab announced the acquisition of Dr. Langer Medical GmbH. Based in Waldkirch, Germany, the family-owned company is active in the development of intraoperative neuromonitoring technology and related equipment for surgical interventions.

In June 2025, Brainlab announced the spin-off of Snke Holding SE, which includes Snke OS and Snke Xplore, formerly known as Level Ex, Mint Medical and VisionTree.

In addition to the Brainlab Companies, Brainlab is present in several countries across Europe, North and South America, Asia, and Australia.

== Products ==
=== Surgery ===
Brainlab develops software technology for planning and navigating surgical procedures, including image enhancement and visualization tools. The various technologies, including image-guided surgery (for example for cranial or spinal navigation and ultrasound), robotic assistance, and intraoperative imaging platforms, are scalable and can be used for imaging, navigation, data enhancement, and data exchange.

The software technologies for surgery include Buzz Digital O.R. and Buzz Virtual, which control the entire operating room and patient data. Navigation technologies feature Curve Navigation, an application for surgical navigation, and Kick, which supports navigation with optical or EM tracking. Additionally, Brainlab offers the Loop-X imaging robot and Cirq, a platform for robotic tasks. The Robotic Suite by Brainlab also enables the combination of robot Loop-X with Curve and Cirq technologies.

Brainlab has also created the Mixed Reality Viewer, which generates hyperrealistic 3D patient data. In 2025, Brainlab received 510(k) clearance from the United States Food and Drug Administration for Spine Mixed Reality Navigation, which puts relevant information directly into the surgeon's field of view through an augmented reality headset that they wear during surgery.

=== Radiosurgery and -therapy ===
Brainlab develops software in radiotherapy and radiosurgery to aid decision-making and dose planning as well as automate treatment plans, adjusting them to meet clinical requirements. The company also creates specialized technologies for extracranial areas like the breast or lungs.

Brainlab offers a range of technologies under the name Elements. These can be customised to meet clinical requirements, use standard interfaces and are compatible with various workflows, treatment systems, and positioning technologies. This includes the creation of radiosurgical plans (Elements Cranial SRS), the treatment of multiple metastases in one session in a non-invasive manner (Elements Multiple Brain Mets SRS), the visualisation of the distinction between brain regions with high and low vascular activity (Elements Contrast Clearance Analysis) and efficient clinical planning (Elements Spine SRS).

ExacTrac Dynamic assists in accurate patient positioning and real-time monitoring during treatment, supporting clinicians in delivering precise image-guided radiotherapy (IGRT) for cranial and spinal SRS and stereotactic body radiotherapy (SBRT) patients. The system also supports the treatment of extracranial conditions like breast and prostate cancer.

== Partnerships ==
In November 2022, it was announced that Brainlab had entered into a cooperation with the venture labs at the Technical University of Munich. In 2023, a collaboration between Brainlab and AO Foundation in medical education and training was launched. Also, the company collaborates with Boston Scientific, primarily in the field of deep brain stimulation.

== Brainlab Culture Program ==
Brainlab has established the Brainlab Culture Program to support various cultural projects. This initiative collaborates with the Bavarian State Opera, the Munich Philharmonic, and Lab Uganda. Among the sponsored projects are notable events such as the concert "Das Virus der Humanität" (The Virus of Humanity) and the art exhibition "I Can't Breathe".
