= Robotic Computer Assisted Implant Surgery =

Use of robots for dental implants

Robotic Computer Assisted Implant Surgery (r-CAIS) is the use of surgical robots and digital technologies for the planning and placement of endosseous or zygomatic dental implants. Robotic systems in implant dentistry are a subset of the wider category of surgical robots, wherein a CAIS robot is defined as "a specialized medical robot intended to conduct or assist in the execution of tasks during dental implant surgery, such as preparation of the osteotomy and/or placement of the dental implant". At a lesser extent, application of robotic CAIS can include other maxillofacial surgery indications, such as extraction of impacted teeth and sinus surgery.

In general, robotic CAIS is considered one of the three execution arms (static, dynamic, robotic) of Computer Assisted Implant Surgery (CAIS), an orofacial application of Computer Assisted Surgery.

== Classification of r-CAIS systems ==
According to the International Organization for Standardization (ISO 8373:2021) and the International Federation of Robotics (IFR), robots are defined as actuated mechanisms with varying degrees of autonomy capable of sensing, processing, and acting upon their environment to perform specific tasks. The new ISO robotics vocabulary standard ISO 8373:2021 defines medical robots as a third category next to industrial and "service robots". In the healthcare context, medical robots can be further classified by the core technologies utilised, autonomy level and indication, including surgical, rehabilitation, diagnostic, and laboratory robots.

With regards to autonomy, the framework proposed by Yang et al., has been adopted to classify CAIS robots. This framework outlines six levels of autonomy, from Level 0 (no autonomy) to Level 5 (full autonomy). Most current systems used in dental implantology operate at Level 1 (robot assistance/collaborative) or Level 2 (task autonomy). No Level 3+ (conditional, high, or full autonomy) robots are currently in clinical use for dental implant surgery.

With regards to core technologies, CAIS robots utilise optical or mechanical tracking for real-time 3D spatial positioning of the end effector. The end effector in these systems is typically a surgical handpiece with a drill bit (to conduct ossteotomy) or a mount for a dental implant.

== Current status ==
At present several CAIS robots are commercially available. Yomi is a collaborative CAIS robot which received FDA approval in USA in 2017. Yakebot is a task autonomous CAIS robot which received Chinese regulatory clearance as Class III Medical Device (CFDA/NMPA) in 2021 and European CE certification in 2025. Both Yomi and Yakebot systems have documented tens of thousands of cases since approval while they are being assessed in a growing number of clinical trials. Newer systems have been launched primarily in China, Including Remebot, Plan-T Aidite, DentRobot, Theta, HRCDIS, Langyue, HRS-DIS with the list growing fast

== Future directions ==
Although currently attracting increasing attention, research & development and investment, robotic CAIS remains a niche market, with significant growth potential but limited commercial scalability and efficiency at present. The core technology is beyond the proof of principle and early commercialization stage, but several barriers need to be overcome before wider adoption. This include the costs of such systems (both initial and incremental/maintenance), the large size, limited scope of indication and also the still training and education requirements for the operators. Future directions of growth will include miniaturization of the systems, cost reduction, increase in efficiency and scope of indication. With regards to autonomy, robotics enthusiasts remain split as whether expanding to level 3 autonomy will be the next breakthrough or the future lies with improving efficiency of collaborative systems and further merging with other CAIS workflows such as dynamic real time navigation. The further implementation of artificial intelligence in the planning and execution of implant surgeries with CAIS systems might be a further critical factor in determining the evolution of robotic systems
