= Surgical segment navigator =

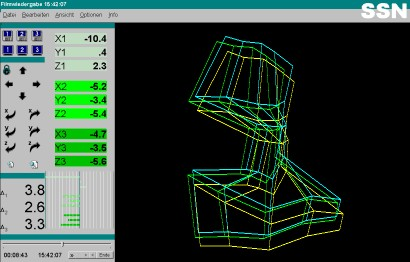
Surgical navigation for the orbit and zygoma on the SSN system (color coding for the preoperative, predicted and goal position of the fragments, respectively)

The surgical segment navigator (SSN) is a computer-based system for use in surgical navigation. It is integrated into a common platform, together with the surgical tool navigator (STN), the surgical microscope navigator (SMN) and the 6DOF manipulator (MKM), developed by Carl Zeiss.

== SSN ==
The SSN has been developed as a computer system for bone segment navigation in oral and maxillofacial surgery. It allows a very precise repositioning of bone fragments, with the advent of preoperative simulation and surgical planning. The system has been developed since 1997 at the University of Regensburg, Germany, with the support of the Carl Zeiss Company. Its principle is based on an infrared localisation system, composed of an infrared camera and at least three infrared transmitters attached to each bony fragment. The SSN is mainly used in orthognatic surgery (surgical correction of dysgnathia), but also for the surgical reconstruction of the orbit, or other surgical interventions to the midface.

== SSN++ ==
Since 2001, at the University of Heidelberg, Germany, the SSN++ has been developed, a markerless-registration navigation system, based on a native (=markerless) CT or MRI. In this case, the patient registration is obtained on the operating table, using a surface scanner. The SSN++ correlates the surface scan data (gathered on the operating table) with the skin surface reconstruction from the dataset obtained preoperatively by CT or MRI. This principle complies with the terrain contour matching principle described for flying objects. The advantage of the new method is that the registration of the patient's position becomes a simple automated procedure; on the other hand, the radiation load for the patient is reduced, compared to the method using markers.
