= Image-guided surgery =

Image-guided surgery (IGS) is any surgical procedure where the surgeon uses tracked surgical instruments in conjunction with preoperative or intraoperative images in order to directly or indirectly guide the procedure. Image guided surgery systems use cameras, ultrasonic, electromagnetic or a combination of fields to capture and relay the patient's anatomy and the surgeon's precise movements in relation to the patient, to computer monitors in the operating room or to augmented reality headsets (augmented reality surgical navigation technology). This is generally performed in real-time though there may be delays of seconds or minutes depending on the modality and application.

Image-guided surgery helps surgeons perform safer and less invasive procedures and has become a recognized standard of care in managing disorders including cranial, otorhinolaryngology, spine, orthopedic, and cardiovascular.

== Benefits ==
The benefits of Image-guided surgery include greater control of the surgical procedure, real-time feedback on the effect of the intervention, reduced tissue trauma and disruption in gaining access to the anatomical structure. Image-guided surgery allows for: reduced post-operative neural deficits and adverse events associated with endovenous laser ablative procedures, and more effective removal of brain tumors that were once considered inoperable due to their size or location.

== Applications ==
During image-guided surgery, the procedure is guided by preoperative or intraoperative imaging. Image-guided surgery has been applied to procedures involving on multiple organs such as the brain, spine, pelvis/hip, knee, lung, breast, liver, and prostate.

Part of the wider field of computer-assisted surgery, image-guided surgery can take place in hybrid operating rooms using intraoperative imaging. A hybrid operating room is a surgical theatre that is equipped with advanced medical imaging devices such as fixed C-Arms, CT scanners or MRI scanners. Most image-guided surgical procedures are minimally invasive. A field of medicine that pioneered and specializes in minimally invasive image-guided surgery is interventional radiology.

A hand-held surgical probe is an essential component of any image-guided surgery system as it provides the surgeon with a map of the designated area. During the surgical procedure, the IGS tracks the probe position and displays the anatomy beneath it as, for example, three orthogonal image slices on a workstation-based 3D imaging system. Existing IGS systems use different tracking techniques including mechanical, optical, ultrasonic, and electromagnetic.

When fluorescence modality is adopted to such devices, the technique is also called fluorescence image-guided surgery.

Image-guided surgery using medical ultrasound utilises sounds waves and as such does not require the protection and safety precautions necessary with ionising radiation modalities such as fluoroscopy, CT, X-Ray and tomography. Optical topographic imaging using structured light and machine vision stereoscopic cameras has been applied in neurosurgical navigation systems to reduce the use of intraoperative ionising radiation as well.

Modern image-guided surgery systems are often combined with robotics.

=== Neurosurgery ===
The various applications of navigation for neurosurgery have been widely used and reported for almost two decades. According to a study in 2000, researchers were already anticipating that a significant portion of neurosurgery would be performed using computer-based interventions. Recent advancements in ultrasound, including intravascular ultrasound (IVUS) allow for real-time cross sectional mapping of vessels and lateral tissues providing calibrated measurements of vessel diameters, contours and morphology.

Image-guided surgery was originally developed for treatment of brain tumors using stereotactic surgery and radiosurgery that are guided by computed tomography (CT), magnetic resonance imaging (MRI) and positron emission tomography (PET) via technologies such as the N-localizer and Sturm-Pastyr localizer.

Image-guided surgery systems are also used in spine surgery to guide the placement of implants and avoid damaging the nearby neurovascular structures.

=== Orthopedics ===
A mini-optical navigation system has been developed that makes real-time measurements to guide surgeons during total hip arthroplasty procedures. This image-guide surgery system involves a patient-mounted camera and a tracker for positional detection by the camera when mounted on surgical instruments or anatomical locations.

=== Urology ===
Image-guided surgery based on MRI is used to guide prostatic biopsy. Image guidance is used to assist surgeons with identifying anatomic landmarks and surgical planes between the prostate and neurovascular bundles during nerve-sparing procedures. This can help reduce negative effects of the procedure like sexual dysfunction and urinary incontinence.

== See also ==
- Computer assisted surgery
- Interventional radiology
- Intraoperative MRI
- Microsoft Hololens
- Radiosurgery
- Stereotactic surgery
