= Articulator =

Device used in dentistry

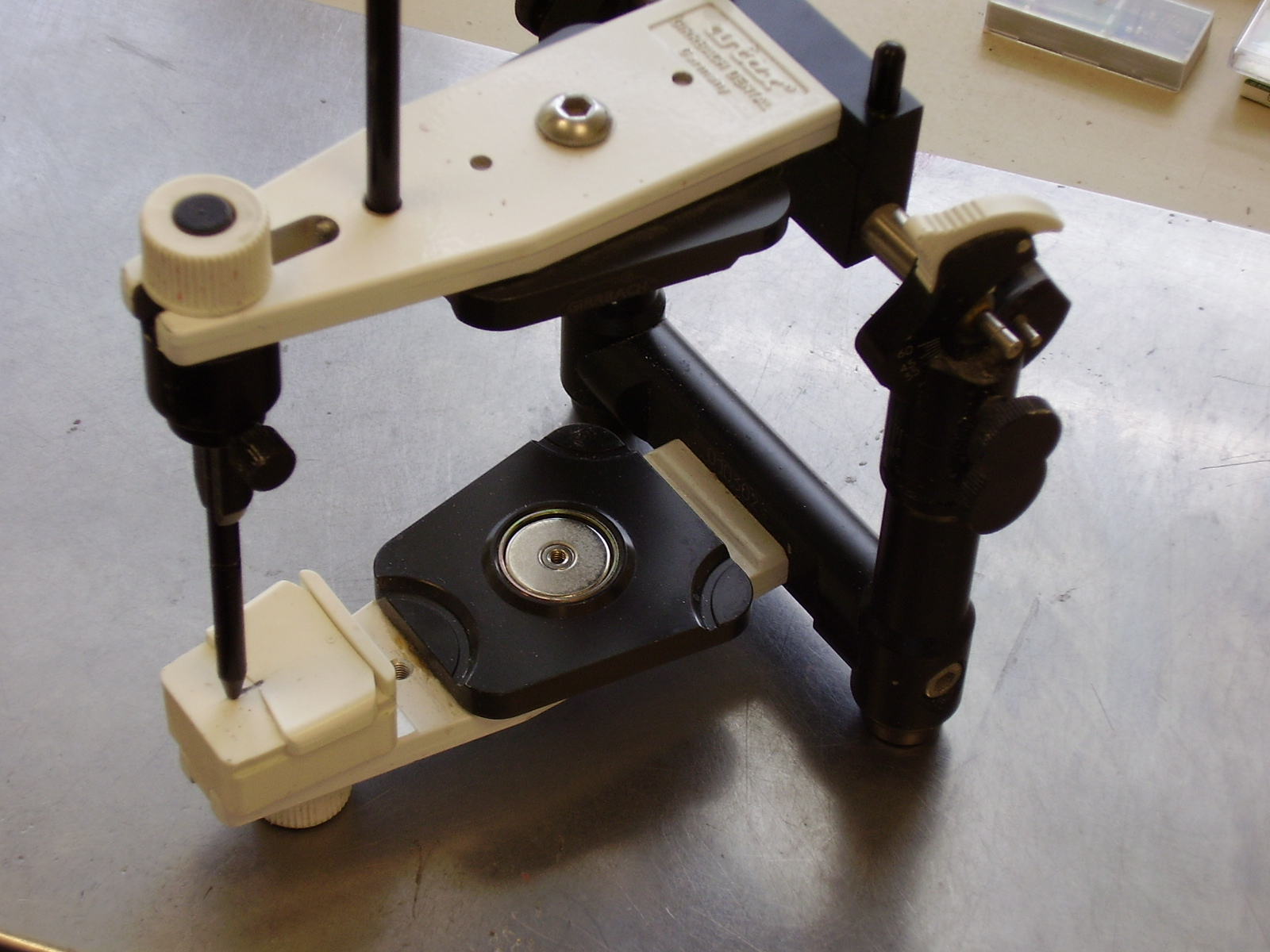
Articulator

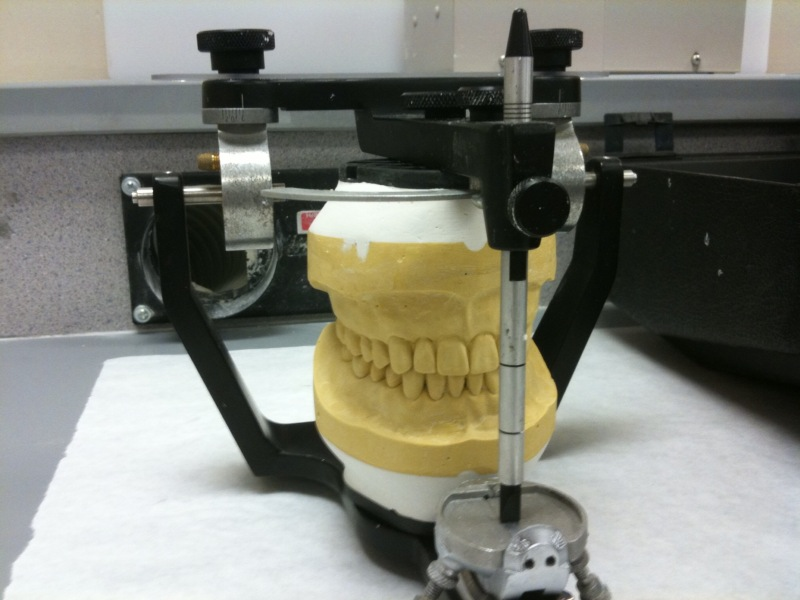
Semi-adjustable articulator with mounted casts

An articulator is a mechanical hinged device used in dentistry to which plaster casts of the maxillary (upper) and mandibular (lower) jaw are fixed, reproducing some or all the movements of the mandible in relation to the maxilla. The human maxilla is fixed and the scope of movement of the mandible (and therefore the dentition) is dictated by the position and movements of the bilateral temperomandibular joints, which sit in the glenoid fossae in the base of the skull. The temperomandibular joints are not a simple hinge but rotate and translate forward when the mouth is opened.

The principal movements reproduced are: at rest (centric jaw relation), in protrusion (to bite), from side to side (lateral excursion) to chew, in retrusion, and any possible combination of these. Counter-intuitively, it is the cast of the maxilla which moves relative to the cast of the mandible and the articulator.

An articulator assists in the accurate fabrication of the biting surfaces of removable prosthodontic appliances (dentures), fixed prosthodontic restorations (implants, crowns, bridges, inlays and onlays) and orthodontic appliances. Used with skill it ensures correct interdigitation of the teeth and an anatomically functional biting plane. This means less occlusal adjustments before and after fitting dental appliances and fewer chronic conflicts between the teeth and the jaw joints.

Articulators are used mainly by dental technicians in fabrication of prostheses and information regarding bite can be communicated from the prescribing dentist via a facebow alone. However it is advantageous when a system is utilised jointly in which case the clinician should adopt the articulator system currently in use in the dental laboratory as they are not compatible with each other.

== Types ==
=== Fully-adjustable articulator ===
A fully-adjustable articulator reproduces the movement of the temporomandibular joints in all possible dimensions and functional movements. They are necessary for large or complex restorative cases where a correct occlusion is being substantively restored. The relationship between the temporomandibular joints and the maxilla and the functional relationship of the jaws are transferred to the articulator by means of a separate facebow. Individual patient's casts may be mounted and dismounted from a single articulator using a variety of disposable baseplates, either mechanical or magnetic.

=== Semi-adjustable articulator ===
A semi-adjustable articulator uses some fixed values based on averages and is not therefore capable of reproducing any particular jaw relationship, or occlusions which are not close to the average. Values which may or may not be fixed include centric jaw relation, protrusion angle, centric shift, lateral and Bennett movements, immediate side-shift and retrusion. The advantage of a semi-adjustable articulator is that it may be adequate for most cases and is less costly.

=== Fixed/Hinge articulator ===
Fixed articulators emulate a simple hinge and disregard all functional movements of the jaw. They are used commonly for single-unit crowns or Angles Class III bites where there is little or no lateral excursion in chewing. Modern hinge articulators are made of a disposable plastic material which may be incorporated into or over the casts and are subject to bending.

== Dental articulator 1840–1912 ==
In 1840 the first US patent for dental articulators was issued to two Philadelphia, Pennsylvania, dentists: James Cameron and Daniley T. Evens. One glaring weakness that became evident shortly after its release was its inability to manage mandibular movement. Through the 1850s and 60s dental scientists investigated the nature of mandibular movement. By the 1900s the single-hinge dental articulators became commonplace. It wasn't until 1910 that dentistry had its first articulator breakthrough due to the work of scientists like W. E. Walker, Alfred Gysi and George Snow. From their work two major schools of articulators developed. On one side there was the new condylar (anatomic) movement and on the other side there was the geometric (non anatomic) movement. The debate between anatomic and non anatomic is demonstrated in this article for an articulator that boasted a simple design. Dr. Rudolph L. Hanau is credited with developing the Hanau articulator in the 1920s.
