= Bone segment navigation =

Surgical method for positioning bone fragments in fractures

Bone segment navigation is a surgical method used to find the anatomical position of displaced bone fragments in fractures, or to position surgically created fragments in craniofacial surgery. Such fragments are later fixed in position by osteosynthesis. It has been developed for use in craniofacial and oral and maxillofacial surgery.

Bone segment navigation is a patented surgical procedure, using a frameless and markerless registration technique. It uses for the first time natural registration surfaces instead of single artificial x-ray visible markers, in order to achieve a higher precision (1 mm and better). Previous methods of Cutting and Watzinger do not meet the criteria of bone segment navigation.

After an accident or injury, a fracture can be produced and the resulting bony fragments can be displaced. In the oral and maxillofacial area, such a displacement could have a major effect both on facial aesthetics and organ function: a fracture occurring in a bone that delimits the orbit can lead to diplopia; a mandibular fracture can induce significant modifications of the dental occlusion; in the same manner, a skull (neurocranium) fracture can produce an increased intracranial pressure.

In severe congenital malformations of the facial skeleton surgical creation of usually multiple bone segments is required with precise movement of these segments to produce a more normal face.

== Surgical planning and surgical simulation ==
An osteotomy is a surgical intervention that consists of cutting through bone and repositioning the resulting fragments in the correct anatomical place. To insure optimal repositioning of the bony structures by osteotomy, the intervention can be planned in advance and simulated. The surgical simulation is a key factor in reducing the actual operating time. Often, during this kind of operation, the surgical access to the bone segments is very limited by the presence of the soft tissues: muscles, fat tissue and skin - thus, the correct anatomical repositioning is very difficult to assess, or even impossible. Preoperative planning and simulation on models of the bare bony structures can be done. An alternate strategy is to plan the procedure entirely on a CT scan generated model and output the movement specifications purely numerically.

== Materials and devices needed for preoperative planning and simulation ==
The osteotomies performed in orthognathic surgery are classically planned on cast models of the tooth-bearing jaws, fixed in an articulator. For edentulous patients, the surgical planning may be made by using stereolithographic models. These tridimensional models are then cut along the planned osteotomy line, slid and fixed in the new position. Since the 1990s, modern techniques of presurgical planning were developed – allowing the surgeon to plan and simulate the osteotomy in a virtual environment, based on a preoperative CT or MRI; this procedure reduces the costs and the duration of creating, positioning, cutting, repositioning and refixing the cast models for each patient.

== Transferring the preoperative planning to the operating theatre ==
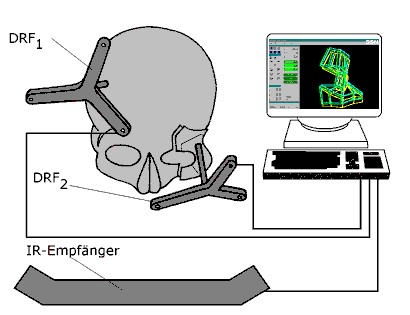
Schematic representation of the principle of bone segment navigation; DRF1 and DRF2 = IR

The usefulness of the preoperative planning, no matter how accurate, depends on the accuracy of the reproduction of the simulated osteotomy in the surgical field. The transfer of the planning was mainly based on the surgeon's visual skills. Different guiding headframes were further developed to mechanically guide bone fragment repositioning.

Such a headframe is attached to the patient's head, during CT or MRI, and surgery. There are certain difficulties in using this device. First, exact reproducibility of the headframe position on the patient's head is needed, both during CT or MRI registration, and during surgery. The headframe is relatively uncomfortable to wear, and very difficult or even impossible to use on small children, who can be uncooperative during medical procedures. For this reason headframes have been abandoned in favor of frameless stereotaxy of the mobilized segments with respect to the skull base. Intraoperative registration of the patient's anatomy with the computer model is done such that pre-CT placement of fiducial points is not necessary.

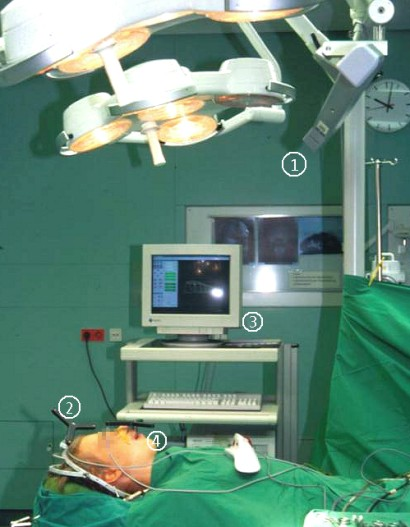
Using the SSN in the operating theatre; 1=IR receiver, 2 and 4=IR Reference devices, 3=SSN-Workstation

== Surgical Segment Navigator ==
Initial bone fragment positioning efforts using an electro-magnetic system were abandoned due to the need for an environment without ferrous metals. In 1991 Taylor at IBM working in collaboration with the craniofacial surgery team at New York University developed a bone fragment tracking system based on an infrared (IR) camera and IR transmitters attached to the skull. This system was patented by IBM in 1994. At least three IR transmitters are attached in the neurocranium area to compensate the movements of the patient's head. There are three or more IR transmitters are attached to the bones where the osteotomy and bone repositioning is about to be performed onto. The 3D position of each transmitter is measured by the IR camera, using the same principle as in satellite navigation. A computer workstation is constantly visualizing the actual position of the bone fragments, compared with the predetermined position, and also makes real-time spatial determinations of the free-moving bony segments resulting from the osteotomy. Thus, fragments can be very accurately positioned into the target position, predetermined by surgical simulation. More recently a similar system, the Surgical Segment Navigator (SSN), was developed in 1997 at the University of Regensburg, Germany, with the support of the Carl Zeiss Company.
