= Sclipo =

Online learning management system

- Website type: Learning Management System, Social network service
- Available in: English, German, Spanish, Russian
- Creators: Gregor Gimmy; Victor Bautista
- Website: sclipo.com
- Commercial: Yes
- Registration: Required
- Launched: 20 Oct 2006
- Current status: Active

Sclipo /ˈsklɪpoʊ/ was a Learning Management System, providing a fully hosted Online Campus solution with web applications that support face-to-face and distance education. The project seems to have closed near the end of 2012.

== History ==
Founded by Gregor Gimmy, Sclipo was launched on October 20, 2006 (then called Visuarios), as a website to share user-generated educational videos. The initial product allowed professional and amateur teachers to share knowledge online through video, making Sclipo one of the first websites of user-generated educational videos. Sclipo then recognized that independent teachers, small schools, and companies in continuous education growingly used generic web applications for teaching such as Skype for live web classes and Slideshare to share documents. Additionally, Sclipo saw that current learning management systems, such as Moodle or Blackboard, were too complex and expensive for a small, 1–15 teacher-sized, educational entity. Sclipo then decided to expand its offering and create a suite of web applications specifically for learning purposes and adapted to the needs of small educational entities in continuous education. These were launched continuously, the first one being the Virtual Classroom (live teaching) application in September 2007. Sclipo website went down about November 2012, and since then redirects to a Spanish informational web catalog.

== Features ==
A Sclipo Online Campus provides synchronous and asynchronous web applications to learn, teach, socialize, administer, promote and sell face-to-face as well as online education services and content.

- Learning & Teaching applications are Course Manager, Library, and a Virtual Classroom for live teaching. Features of the Course Manager include a learning path, tests, discussion forum, content sharing, progress control, and live web classes. The Library allows teachers to store and share content in multiple formats: documents, videos, audio, and images. Teachers can upload their content to their Library and add that from popular generic content-sharing websites such as Slideshare, Scribd, Vimeo, and YouTube. The Virtual Classroom application allows holding live classes, webinars, and meetings via a web conferencing system over the Internet. Features include multiple video and audio sharing, desktop sharing, presentations with an integrated whiteboard, and public and private chat.
- Social applications include a private personal profile, a contact network, online groups, an event organizer, discussion forums, walls, feeds, the ability to follow Online Campuses, a messaging system, and Facebook Connect. Sclipo also provides a social network of Online Campuses with central search and browse capabilities, called Campus, enabling teachers and students from different Online Campuses to connect and share.
- Administration applications include tools to customize the look & feel, name, and URL of the Online Campus, to set privacy levels of activities and content, to set admission policies, to invite and administer students and teachers.
- Promotion and eCommerce applications include Campus Classifieds on which new courses, content, and live sessions can be announced, as well as features to promote courses and content on social media, features to define prices and forms of payment, and a gateway to collect fees for courses and other educational services by credit card.

== Awards ==
- Nominated for TheEuropas, Best Learning Startup 2010 by Techcrunch
- Winner, White Bull Award 2010
- Finalist, Plugg Start-Ups Rally 2010
- Winner, Red Herring Global 100, 2008
- First Prize, European Startup 2.0 Awards, 2007

== See also ==
- E-learning
- Learning management system
- Course management system
- Virtual learning environment
- Virtual campus
- Web application
