= Leksell =

Leksell is a surname. Notable people with the surname include:

- Alexander Leksell (born 1997), Swedish footballer
- Lars Leksell (1907–1986), Swedish neurosurgeon
- Laurent Leksell (born 1952), Swedish economist, international business leader and entrepreneur
- Victor Leksell (born 1997), Swedish singer
