= John R. Adler =

American neurosurgeon (born 1954)

- Born: 1954 (age 71–72); Yonkers, New York, U.S.
- Education: Harvard University
- Children: Trip Adler

John R. Adler (born 1954) is an American neurosurgeon and businessman who founded the journal Cureus.

== Biography ==
John R. Adler was born in Yonkers, New York in 1954. He graduated from Harvard College in 1976 and Harvard Medical School in 1980. From 1980 to 1987 he completed a neurosurgical residency at Massachusetts General Hospital and Brigham and Women's Hospital. Adler subsequently completed a radiosurgery fellowship at the Karolinska Institute in Sweden, where he worked alongside Professor Lars Leksell. Professor Leksell is credited with inventing the Gamma Knife and the field of stereotactic radiosurgery (SRS), a non-invasive alternative to surgery for treating brain tumors and other intracranial functional and vascular diseases.

Adler subsequently joined the faculty of Stanford University School of Medicine in 1987 as an assistant professor in the department of neurosurgery. In 1987 he was also made an assistant professor of radiation oncology. In 1998 Adler was made a full professor in both the neurosurgery and radiation oncology departments. In 2007 he was named the Dorothy and Thye King Chan Professor of neurosurgery. He was eventually appointed an emeritus professor of neurosurgery.

In 1985, while working alongside Professor Lars Leksell, Adler was astonished and inspired with Gamma Knife radiosurgery but saw an opportunity to improve. The Gamma Knife relied on a stereotactic frame screwed into the patient's skull as an external surrogate to triangulate the location of the subject's tumor; Adler instead wanted to rely on recent medical imaging advancements and internal anatomical structures to guide the beam. Adler also sought to eliminate the costs to secure and regularly replace the Gamma Knife system’s Cobalt-60 radioactive sources; Adler instead wanted to use a modern linear accelerator for beam generation.

When he returned to Stanford he worked with faculty in the engineering school to build a prototype SRS system, and by 1987 was pitching his invention, the CyberKnife, to venture capitalists. Following repeated rejections, in 1990 Adler raised $800,000 from other neurosurgeons, friends, and family, and started the company, Accuray. Adler served as chief medical officer while remaining on the Stanford faculty. The company ran out of money in 1994 and had other struggles; Adler took a leave of absence from Stanford in 1999 and took over as CEO, serving in that role until 2002, when he stepped back into being CMO.

In 2009, Adler founded Cureus (originally known as peerEmed.com), a web-based peer-reviewed medical journal that combines attributes of traditional experts and crowd sourcing for pre-publication inspection and peer-review. In 2022, Cureus was acquired by Springer Nature.

In April 2010, Adler was appointed vice president and chief of New Clinical Applications at Varian Medical Systems.

Since 2015 he has served as the founder and CEO of Zap Surgical Systems.

In 2018 Adler was awarded the Cushing Award for Technical Excellence and Innovation in Neurosurgery, presented at the AANS Annual Scientific Meeting. In 2025, Adler was inducted into the National Inventors Hall of Fame and named one of three finalists for the Thomas J. Fogarty Innovation Prize.

He is the father of Trip Adler, co-founder and CEO of Scribd, and Brit Adler, assistant professor of medicine in the division of rheumatology at Johns Hopkins Medicine.

== Works ==
- Adler, John R. Jr.; et al. (1997). "The Cyberknife: a frameless robotic system for radiosurgery". Stereotactic and Functional Neurosurgery. 69 (1–4 Pt 2): 124–128. doi:10.1159/000099863. PMID 9711744.
- Adler, John (September 16, 2009). "Accuray, Inc.: A Neurosurgical Business Case Study". Cureus. 1 (9): 11–24. doi:10.7759/cureus.1.
