= Cyberknife =

Cyberknife may refer to:

- Cyberknife (horse), a Thoroughbred race horse, winner of the 2022 Arkansas Derby
- Cyberknife (device), is a radiation therapy device manufactured by Accuray Incorporated
- Oklahoma CyberKnife, is a cancer treatment center based in Oklahoma
- Reno CyberKnife, is a cancer treatment center based in Reno, Nevada
