= Stadtarchiv Speyer =

Coordinates: 49.319598°N 8.436642°E

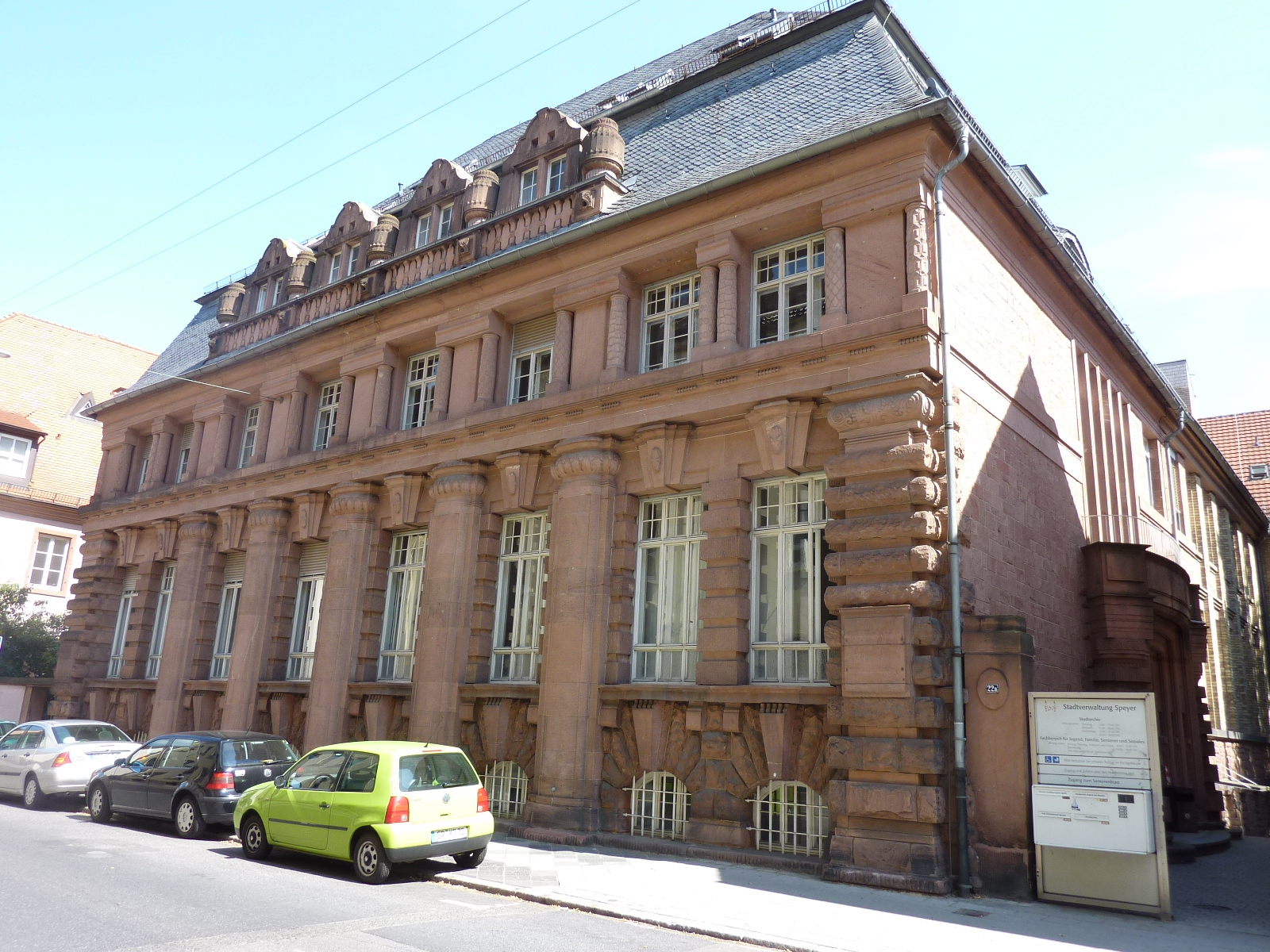
Stadtarchiv Speyer, since 1995

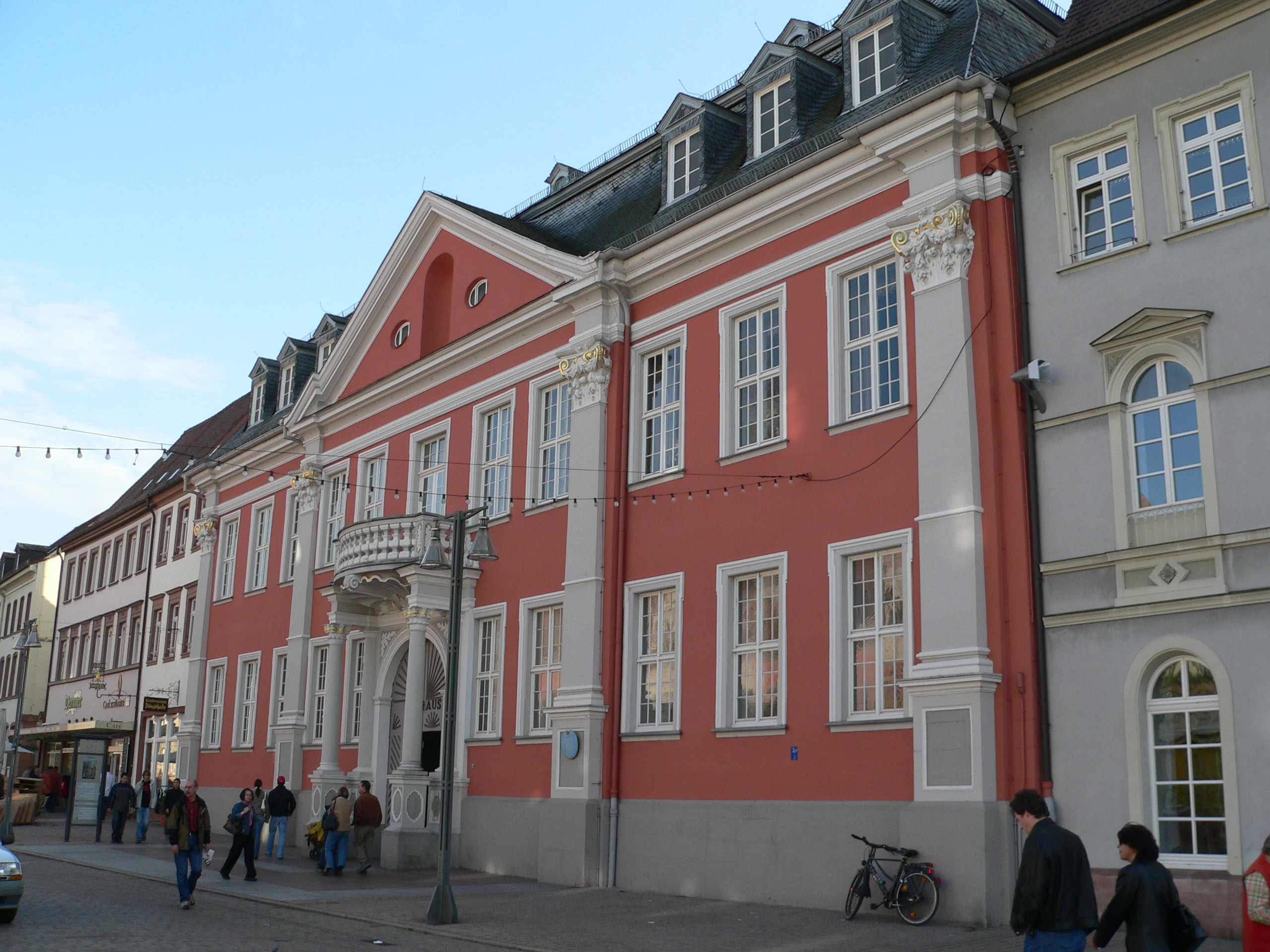
Speyer townhall with city archives 1726–1995

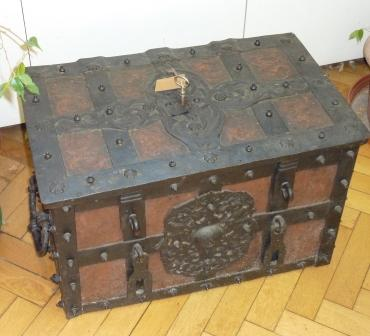
Stadtarchiv Speyer, Rote Lade

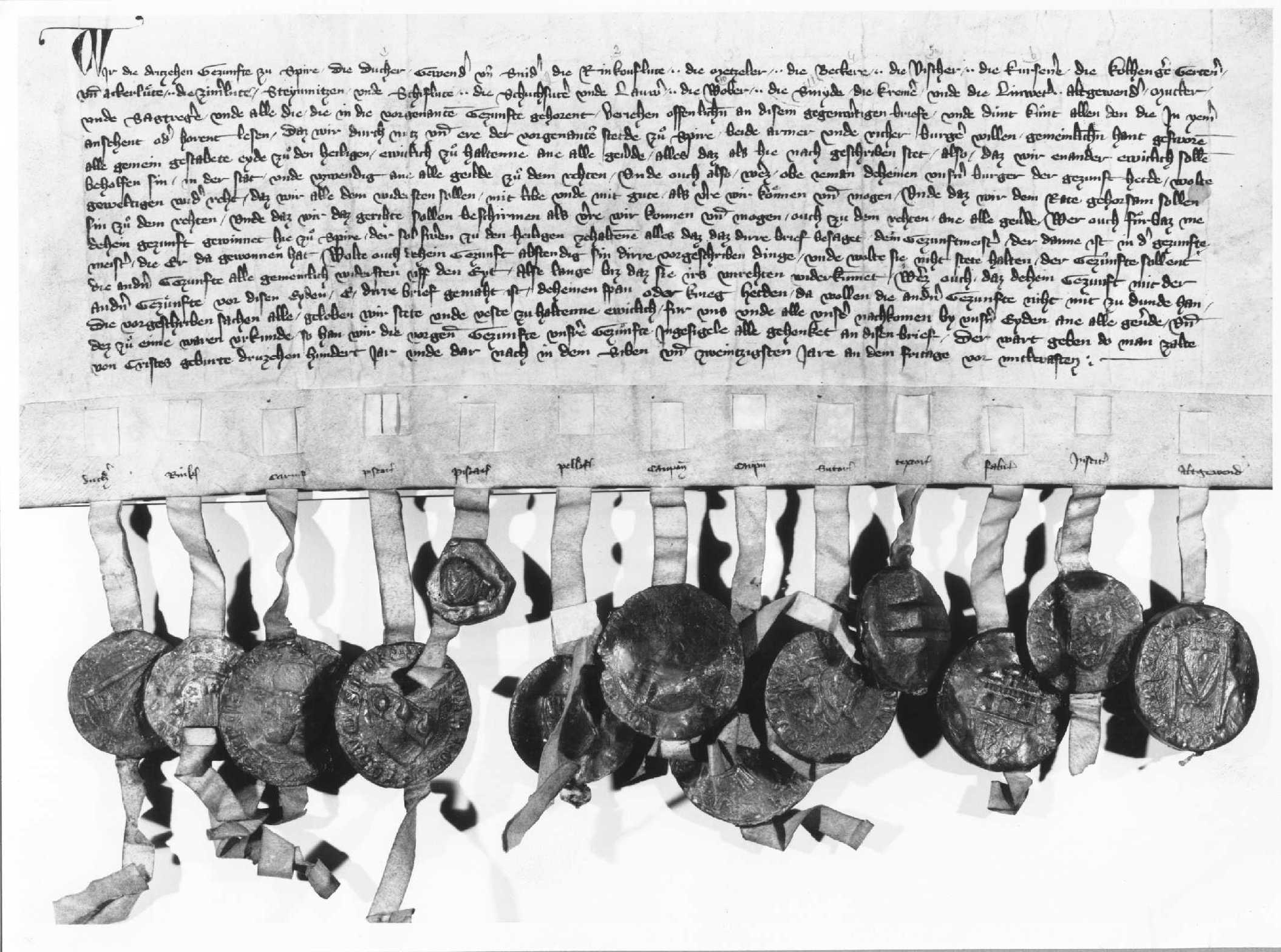
Document issued by the 13 guilds, 20 March 1327

The Stadtarchiv Speyer is the oldest municipal archive of the Palatinate.

The earliest document, which is kept in the city archives of Speyer, is a document of emperor Friedrich I of 1182, in which the privileges granted by emperor Heinrich V to the town of Speyer in 1111 were confirmed and extended. The tradition of the archive dates back to the late 13th century, when Speyer became a Free Imperial Town of the Holy Roman Empire in 1294.

Now it is one of the oldest offices in Speyer. In addition to a large number of historically important documents and archives, it also offers today a large collection of photo and newspaper collections,

== History ==
The most important documents were kept in the so-called Rote Lade. This "red box" is a massive metal cabinet with a complicated closing mechanism. It is still in the city archives and one of the unique items, which are shown in regularly changing exhibitions in the city archives. The key to this archive was in the custody of municipal officials. The Archivarius, the municipal archivist belonged to the city councilors or the syndics.

The beginnings of the archives of the imperial city of Speyer were already published in the 14th / 15th century. On December 18, 1498, emperor Maximilian I asked the council of the city of Speyer to send him the oldest German document in the original from his archive. Other personalities, such as Christoph Lehmann (1568–1638), a municipal clerk and writer of a chronicle, also used the archive intensively. Later, his meaning receded, and only a few connoisseurs knew about him. Between 1527 and 1689, Speyer had been the seat of the Reichskammergericht (Imperial Chamber Court).

Thus, over time, the rumor grew that the sources of the city's history had been lost during the demolition of Speyer in the Nine Years' War (1689). In fact the city archives had been fled to Frankfurt and Strasbourg and they had been kept in a completeness, as they can not show too many cities in this German region. The remaining documents had been stored since 1726 in the then new townhall. The historical archive magazine with its transportable wall cabinets is still preserved today.

In 1816 Speyer became the capital of the Bavarian Palatinate, which was one of the administrative districts of the Kingdom of Bavaria. The administration of the archive was assigned to an official of the Royal District Archives, Speyer, as a salaried office. As a result of the care provided by specialists, there was a change in the order, the preservation and the use of the archival materials. In 1909 the city archives the move to the new fire-resistant magazine took place.

In March 1995, the Stadtarchiv finally moved to its present premises in Johannesstrasse 22a. This former factory building was previously used by the Pfälzische Landesbibliothek.

== Present times ==
Since 1995, the Memory of the City is owner of a large reading room, which is also used as a lecture room, as well as two magazines and office spaces. Through the participation in the DFG project "Virtual German Urkundennetzwerk" (VdU), in which all documents have been digitized, the user has the opportunity to view Speyer documents in the virtual archive "Monasterium". The archive is currently also involved in the EU project "European network on archival cooperation" ("ENArC"), as well as in the interregional project "Archivum Rhenanum".

In addition, the City Archives Speyer regularly offer changing exhibitions, which inform about old and new stocks and innovations. Since 2011, the Stadtarchiv Speyer, which is active on Twitter, Facebook and Slideshare among others, belongs to the comparatively few German archives, which are intensively engaged in Web 2.0.

As a result of a restructuring of the departments of the City Administration of Speyer, the Stadtarchiv has been operating since May 2012 as its own department: Abteilung Kulturelles Erbe (Stadtarchiv, Museen, Gedenkstätten), "Department of Cultural Heritage (City Archives, Museums, Memorials)".

== Management ==
- 1976–2010 Dorothee Menrath († 4 November 2013)
- 2011–2015 Joachim Kemper
- 2016– Christiane Pfanz-Sponagel

== Bibliography ==
- Christoph Lehmann: Chronica Der Freyen Reichs Statt Speyr. Erste Ausgabe. Rosen, Frankfurt am Main 1612.
- Albert Pfeiffer: Das Archiv der Stadt Speier. Speier 1912.
- Dorothee Menrath: "Gedächtnis" der Stadt. Archiv hegt auf 1500 Regalmetern wertvolle Historie. In: SPEYER. Das Vierteljahresheft des Verkehrsvereins in Zusammenarbeit mit der Stadtverwaltung. Speyer, Winter 1994, p. 3–19.
