= Tony Grimminck =

Australian business executive

- Born: Bundaberg, Queensland, Australia
- Education: University of New South Wales (BEng (Hons), MEngSc); Columbia University (MBA)
- Occupation: Business executive
- Employer: Scribd
- Title: Chief executive officer (CEO)
- Term: 2024–present
- Predecessor: Trip Adler

Tony Grimminck is an Australian business executive who serves as the chief executive officer (CEO) of Scribd.

== Early life and career ==
Tony Grimminck is a native of Bundaberg, Queensland, Australia. He was an officer in the Australian Army, later worked at Goldman Sachs, JPMorgan Chase, StubHub and HotelTonight before joining Scribd. He has completed Bachelor of Engineering (Honours) and a Master of Engineering Science from the University of New South Wales and a Master of Business Administration from Columbia University.

== See also ==
- Trip Adler
- Jared Friedman
- Tikhon Bernstam
