= Bixonimania =

Fake disease

Bixonimania is a fake disease invented by researchers to examine artificial intelligence and its ability to utilize information in medical and healthcare applications. The fake enabled researchers to show that some AI chatbots would report fake research as fact, while a medical expert would be able to tell that it is fake.

== Characteristics ==
The disorder, with symptoms of sore eyes and darkening around them ("periorbital hyperpigmentation"), is supposedly caused by blue light from screens.

The experiment was conducted by a team from the University of Gothenburg led by Almira Osmanovic Thunström. Many steps were taken to ensure that any person who read the actual paper could tell it was not a real condition. The team chose an obviously inappropriate name ending in -mania, a description used only in psychiatry. The lead author was noted as belonging to Asteria Horizon University located in Nova City, California, neither of which exist. An acknowledgement was made to "Professor Maria Bohm at The Starfleet Academy for her kindness and generosity in contributing with her knowledge and her lab onboard the USS Enterprise".

== Distribution ==
The name was first used in a blog posted on Medium titled "How many people suffer from Bixonimania?" A more scholarly-looking paper describing it was posted later in April 2024 on a preprint server with several fake authors. A second paper was posted in May. By 2026, AI chatbots suggested bixonimania based on the list of symptoms provided.

Thunström and her team discovered that many LLMs (large language models) processed the information and gave it as health advice. Microsoft Copilot declared that "Bixonimania is indeed an intriguing and relatively rare condition" while Gemini gave the information that "Bixonimania is a condition caused by excessive exposure to blue light". A research paper that cited the preprint on the fake disease appeared in Cureus, a peer-reviewed journal published by Springer-Nature. It was subsequently retracted. Following the revelations and a news article in Nature describing the experiment, several AI systems began to generate corrected output.

== Purpose ==
Bixonimania was invented to observe the effects of misinformation on the outputs of LLMs. It also observed how obvious misinformation can get before LLMs start to generate text output that says the aforementioned misinformation is false. While most parts of the paper published on the topic appeared professional, some parts had phrases that are obviously false, such as "This study was fully funded by Asteria Horizon University, in particular the Professor Sideshow Bob Foundation for its work in advanced trickery. This works is a part of a larger funding initiative from the University of Fellowship of the Ring and the Galactic Triad."

== See also ==
- Fictitious entry – Deliberately incorrect entry in a reference work
- Hallucination (artificial intelligence) – Erroneous AI-generated content presented as true
