= Elekta =

Swedish company

Elekta AB
- Type: Public
- Traded as: Nasdaq Stockholm: EKTA B
- Industry: Neuroscience Radiation therapy Radiosurgery Oncology Electronic medical record
- Founded: 1972
- Founder: Lars Leksell, Laurent Leksell
- Headquarters: Stockholm, Sweden
- Number of locations: Elekta has offices in more than 40 countries. Primary locations include: Stockholm, Crawley, Veenendaal, Warsaw, Helsinki, Milan, Cairo, Istanbul, New Delhi, Seoul, Beijing, Shanghai, Hong Kong, Tokyo, Sydney, San Jose, California, Atlanta, Montreal, Mexico City, São Paulo
- Key people: Jakob Just-Bomholt, President and CEO
- Products: Elekta Unity MR-Linac, Leksell Gamma Knife, Versa HD linear accelerator, Evo linear accelerator, Harmony linear accelerator, Brachytherapy products; as well as Oncology Information System (MOSAIQ), Treatment Planning Software (Monaco)
- Net income: -517 million SEK
- Number of employees: 4,100
- Website: www.elekta.com

Elekta AB is a global Swedish medical technology company that develops and produces produces equipment and software for radiation therapy and radiosurgery in the treatment of cancer and brain disorders. The company is headquartered in Stockholm, Sweden, and is listed on Nasdaq Stockholm.

== History ==
Elekta was founded in 1972 by Lars Leksell, Professor of Neurosurgery at the Karolinska Institute in Stockholm, Sweden, and his son Laurent (Larry) Leksell. The company was established to develop and commercialize technologies including the Leksell Stereotactic System, and Leksell Gamma Knife, based on work initiated by Lars Leksell in the preceding decades.

Elekta has been listed on Nordic Exchange (Nasdaq Stockholm) under the ticker EKTAb since 1994. Larry Leksell served as President and CEO until 2005 and subsequently became Chairman Of the Board. The role President and CEO has since been held by the following:

- Tomas Puusepp: May 2005 to May 2014
- Niklas Savander: May 2014 to May 2015
- Tomas Puusepp: May 2015 to June 2016
- Richard Hausmann: June 2016 until June 2020
- Gustaf Salford: June–November 2020 (Acting); November 2020 - March 2025
- Jonas Bolander: March 2025 to September 2025 (Acting)
- Jakob Just-Bomholt: September 2025 - present

=== Acquired companies ===
Elekta has made a number och acquisitions as part of its developement, including Philips Medical Systems radiotherapy division, IMPAC Medical Systems, Inc., Beijing Medical Equipment Institute (BMEI), 3D Line Medical Systems, CMS, Inc., Nucletron, ProKnow Systems, LLC,

== Products ==
Elekta develops medical devices and software used in radiation therapy, radiosurgery and oncology care. Its products include linear accelerators, stereotactic radiosurgery systems, brachytherapy equipment, oncology information systems and radiation treatment planning software.

=== Neurosurgery products ===
Elekta's neurosurgery products include the Leksell Stereotactic System, and Leksell Gamma Knife. Gamma Knife is a stereotactic radiosurgery system that uses focused gamma radiation to treat conditions in the brain such as brain tumors. The technology was developed from work by Lars Leksell and collaborators at Karolinska Institute and Uppsala University.

=== Linear accelerators ===
Elekta produces linear accelerators (linacs) used for external beam radiotherapy (EBRT), the most common form of radiotherapy (radiation therapy). Its systems include Versa HD, Elekta Unity, Harmony and Evo. Elekta Unity combines a linear accelerator with magnetic resonance imaging and was developed in collaboration with UMC Utrecht and Philips.

=== Brachytherapy devices ===
Following its acquisition of Nucletron in 2011, Elekta expanded it's brachytherapy business. Its brachytherapy products include Flexitron afterloading systems, applicators for brachytherapy procedures, Oncentra Brachy treatment planning software and ImagingRing for imaging.

=== Software ===
Elekta's software products include MOSAIQ, an oncology information system (OIS) and Monaco, a radiation therapy treatment planning system.

== Sustainability and foundation ==
Elekta has a Global Environment Policy addressing the environmental impact of its operations, products and services. In 2021, the company issued a SEK 1.5 billion sustainability-linked bond with a social performance target.

In August 2021, Elekta's shareholders approved the establishment of the Elekta Foundation. The foundation supports projects and programs with governments, NGOs and healthcare providers in low- and middle-income countries.
