= IntelliMax =

IntelliMax is the name of several different brands or enterprises:

- A software services and product based company based in India. Intellimax Technologies Pvt Ltd (Intellimax.io). Specialized products for: 1: Mutual fund distributors, 2: Tracking field employees, 3: Distribution management system for manufacturers.
- An automation system by American firm SenSys.
- IntelliMax Solutions, an Australian provider of Business intelligence software
- A brand of load management switches made by Fairchild Semiconductor
- Elekta IntelliMax, a platform for the delivery of remote services for the support of treatment delivery suites, by Swedish firm Elekta
- Online marketing software IntelliMaxx by Canadian firm dthree.
