= Accuray =

American radiation therapy company

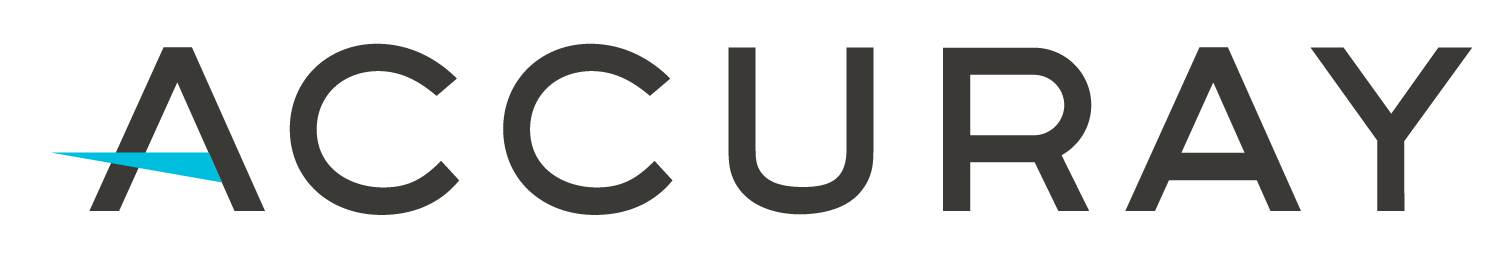
- Type: Public company
- Traded as: Nasdaq: ARAY
- Founded: 1992
- Founder: John R. Adler
- Headquarters: Madison, Wisconsin, United States
- Products: CyberKnife, tomotherapy

Accuray is a radiation therapy company that develops, manufactures, and sells radiation therapy systems to deliver treatments including stereotactic radiosurgery (SRS) and stereotactic body radiation therapy (SBRT). It is the developer of innovative technologies, the CyberKnife and TomoTherapy platforms, including the Radixact System, the latest generation TomoTherapy platform. The company is headquartered in Madison, WI. The platforms are installed in leading healthcare centers in approximately fifty countries globally.

== History ==
Accuray was founded in 1990 by John R. Adler, a Stanford neurosurgeon, and commenced commercial operations in 1992.

In February 2007, Accuray was registered under the ticker NASDAQ:ARAY. In 2011, Accuray completed its $277 million acquisition of TomoTherapy Inc., creator of advanced radiation therapy solutions for cancer care.

In 2012, the company acquired Morphormics for a total $5.7 million. Morphormics was founded by University of North Carolina at Chapel Hill faculty and specialized in developing imaging software.

In 2015, Accuray signed an agreement with RaySearch Laboratories AB to integrate treatment planning support for TomoTherapy, Radixact and CyberKnife.

In July 2019, Accuray joint venture with CNNC Accuray in Tianjin received the license for operating in China.

In August 2023, Accuray changed its head quarters from Sunnyvale, California USA to Madison, Wisconsin, USA.

== Partners ==
- BRAINLAB
- C-RAD
- GE HealthCare
- LIMBUS AI
- RAYSEARCH
- SCANDIDOS
