= Tulebo =

- Location within Västra Götaland Location within Sweden
- Coordinates: 57°37′N 12°06′E
- Country: Sweden
- Province: Västergötland
- County: Västra Götaland County
- Municipality: Mölndal Municipality

Area
  - Total: 0.35 km^{2} (0.14 sq mi)

Population (31 December 2010)
  - Total: 213
  - Density: 610/km^{2} (1,600/sq mi)
- Time zone: UTC+1 (CET)
  - Summer (DST): UTC+2 (CEST)

Tulebo is a locality situated in Mölndal Municipality, Västra Götaland County, Sweden with 213 inhabitants in 2010.
