= Parse, Inc. =

Defunct company

- Founded: June 1, 2011
- Founder: Tikhon Bernstam; Ilya Sukhar; Kevin Lacker; James Yu
- Fate: Defunct, 2016
- Headquarters: Menlo Park, California, U.S.
- Parent: Facebook, Inc.
- Website: parse.com

Parse, Inc. was a company acquired by Meta (then named Facebook) in 2013 and shut down in January 2017. They developed a MBaaS platform, Parse. Following the announcement in 2016 of the impending shutdown, the platform was subsequently open sourced.

After the hosted service was shut down, the open source version grew into an open source community with its own blog, documentation, and community forum.

== History ==
Parse was founded in 2011 by Tikhon Bernstam, Ilya Sukhar, James Yu, and Kevin Lacker, previously at Google and Y Combinator. The firm produces back-end tools for mobile developers that help mobile developers store data in the cloud, manage identity log-ins, handle push notifications and run custom code in the cloud.

On November 9, 2011, it raised $5.5 million in venture capital funding. In 2012, its tools were being used by 20,000 mobile developers and that number was growing at 40% monthly. On Sept 11, 2012, it added the ability to create custom code on the back end.

Fast Company named Parse one of the top 50 most innovative companies of 2013.

Facebook acquired the firm for $85 million in 2013.

In 2014, Parse was reported to power 500,000 mobile apps.

On 28 January 2016, Facebook open sourced Parse Platform and announced that it will close its Parse Hosting Service, with services effectively shutting down on 28 January 2017.

Facebook opened the application source code in order to allow users to perform the migration to self-hosted Parse Server. A range of vendors are able to host Parse applications, providing migration alternatives.

The service operated until 30 January 2017, at which point all users needed to migrate their applications to self-hosted Parse Server or move to other platforms.
