= RaySearch Laboratories =

Swedish enterprise

RaySearch Laboratories AB (publ)
- Company type: Public (Aktiebolag)
- Traded as: Nasdaq Stockholm: RAY B
- Industry: Medical technology
- Founded: 2000
- Headquarters: Stockholm, Sweden
- Key people: Johan Löf, President, CEO & founder
- Revenue: ▲MSEK 1,192.0 (2024); MSEK 1,022.2 (2023)
- Operating income: ▲MSEK 260.5 (2024); MSEK 114.9 (2023)
- Total assets: ▲MSEK 2,091.2 (2024); MSEK 1,952.7 (2023)
- Total equity: ▲MSEK 876.7(2024); MSEK 735.2 (2023)
- Number of employees: Approx. 190
- Website: raysearchlabs.com

RaySearch Laboratories (AB publ) is a Swedish medical technology company that develops software used in radiation therapy of cancer. The company markets its products worldwide and has subsidiaries in the United States, Singapore, Belgium, France, Germany, and the United Kingdom.

RaySearch markets the RayStation treatment planning system. Its products are also distributed through licensing agreements with medical technology companies including Accuray, Mevion, Philips, Nucletron, IBA, Varian, and Brainlab.

RaySearch is a public company listed on the Nasdaq Stockholm stock exchange. Effective on 4 January 2016, RaySearch series B share (RAY B) was moved from the Small Cap to the Mid Cap segment of Nasdaq Stockholm, which is the segment for companies with a market value of at least 150 million euros and up to one billion.

== History ==
RaySearch was established in 2000 as a spin-off from Karolinska Institutet in Stockholm. Founder and CEO Johan Löf started the company based on knowledge acquired during his PhD work on radiation treatment of moving tumors at Karolinska Institutet in Stockholm, Sweden. A few months after its establishment, RaySearch entered into a partnership agreement with Philips Medical Systems, which resulted in the development of the P3 IMRT module of the Pinnacle treatment planning system in 2001.

In 2003, RaySearch was listed on the O-list of the Stockholm Stock Exchange, which has been part of Nasdaq since 2008. Between 2004 and 2007, RaySearch entered into partnership agreements with Nucletron, IBA Dosimetry, TomoTherapy, and Varian Medical Systems. RaySearch algorithms were adopted for use in several of the leading radiation therapy treatment planning systems.

RaySearch also began engaging in clinical research collaborations, notably working with Princess Margaret Hospital, and Massachusetts General Hospital, to pioneer adaptive therapy and multi-criteria optimization.

In 2008, RaySearch made the decision to develop and market its own treatment planning system. The RayStation system was launched in 2009, and West German Proton Therapy Center Essen placed the first order in the same year.

RayStation received US FDA 510(k) clearance in 2010 and Massachusetts General Hospital subsequently placed the first US order for the system. The first patient treatment with RayStation took place in 2011 at Massachusetts General Hospital.

The first complete version of RayStation was released in 2012, and RayStation was approved for sale in China in 2013.

== Current products ==
=== RayStation ===
RayStation is a treatment planning system for radiation therapy of cancer. The system supports several treatment techniques, including:

- 3D-CRT
- Electron therapy
- IMRT
- Helical Tomotherapy
- VMAT
- Proton therapy
- Carbon-ion therapy
- Adaptive radiation therapy
