= Slide hosting service =

Website for hosting and showing slideshows

A slide hosting service is a website that allows users to upload, view, comment, and share slideshows created with presentation programs. According to Alexa and Compete rankings, the most popular slide hosting services include websites such as SlideShare, MyPlick, Slideboom, SlideServe, SlideWorld and SlidePub.

== Main range of application ==
Slide hosting services became very popular in such fields as eLearning and web conferencing. Many electronic courses contain videos, audios, animations, which is easy to accomplish within a PowerPoint presentation. After uploading a presentation to a slide hosting service, a user receives an HTML code, which allows embedding it to a website or blog, or sharing it with a friend afterwards. Slide hosting services’ users can join groups by interests and debate about any subject they are interested in. These portals are also used in advertising purposes.

== Technical concepts ==
Slide hosting services convert uploaded files into the Flash format. It allows viewing video clips online while downloading them and reducing the original file size. SlidePub, SlideShare and authorSTREAM services uses HTML5 format.

== Popular slide hosting services (features) ==
	SlideShare	MyPlick	SlideBoom	SlideServe	authorSTREAM	SlidePub
publish
public	Yes	Yes	Yes	Yes	Yes	Yes
private	Yes	Yes	Yes	Yes	Yes	No
download
ppt	Yes	Yes	Yes	Yes	Yes	No
email	Yes	Yes	Yes	Yes	Yes	Yes
social networks	Yes	Yes	Yes	Yes	Yes	Yes
embed	Yes	Yes	Yes	Yes	Yes	Yes
HTML5 format
support	No	No	No	No	No	Yes
supported files
ppt	Yes	Yes	Yes	Yes	Yes	Yes
pdf	Yes	Yes	No	No	No	Yes
pptx	Yes	Yes	Yes	Yes	Yes	Yes
keynote	Yes	Yes	No	No	No	No
audio hosting	No	Yes	No	No	No	No
commentation
text	Yes	Yes	Yes	Yes	Yes	No
graphical annotations	No	No	Yes	No	No	No
audio	Yes	Yes	No	No	No	No
video	Yes	No	No	No	No	No
member
personal messages	Yes	Yes	No	Yes	No	Yes
favorites presentations	Yes	Yes	Yes	Yes	Yes	
contacts	Yes	Yes	No	Yes	Yes	Yes
player
full screen	Yes	Yes	Yes	Yes	Yes	No
play/pause	Yes	Yes	Yes	Yes	Yes	No
next step	Yes	Yes	Yes	Yes	Yes	Yes
previous step	Yes	Yes	Yes	Yes	Yes	Yes
thumbnails	Yes	Yes	Yes	Yes	Yes	Yes
transitions	No	No	Yes	Yes	No	Yes
animations	No	No	Yes	Yes	Yes	No
narrations	Yes	Yes	Yes	Yes	Yes	No
sounds	No	Yes	Yes	Yes	Yes	No
music integration	No	Yes	No	Yes	Yes	No
videos	No	No	Yes	No	Yes	No
audio synchronization	Yes	Yes	No	No	Yes	No
presentation details
title	Yes	Yes	Yes	Yes	Yes	Yes
description	Yes	Yes	Yes	Yes	Yes	Yes
tags	Yes	Yes	Yes	Yes	Yes	No
category	Yes	Yes	Yes	Yes	Yes	No
language	Yes	Yes	Yes	No	No	No
presentation statistic
views	Yes	Yes	Yes	Yes	Yes	Yes
embeds	Yes	Yes	Yes	Yes	Yes	Yes
favorites	Yes	Yes	Yes	Yes	Yes	No
comments	Yes	Yes	Yes	Yes	No	Yes
business analytics	No	Yes	No	No	Yes	No
graphic dashboard	No	Yes	No	Yes	No	Yes
other
PRO account	Yes	No	Yes	No	Yes	Yes
friend feed	Yes	Yes	No	No	No	No
groups	Yes	No	Yes	Yes	No	No
private groups	Yes	No	Yes	Yes	No	No
events	Yes	No	No	No	No	No
presentation transcript	Yes	Yes	Yes	Yes	Yes	No
ppt to youtube	No	No	No	No	Yes	No
youtube videos to ppt	Yes	No	Yes	Yes	Yes	No
oneclick desktop ppt publish	Yes	Yes	Yes	Yes	No	No
max file size	100	100	100	100	1000	100
Prevent download	Yes	No	No	No	No	No
watermarking	No	No	No	No	No	No
