= Rashmi Sinha =

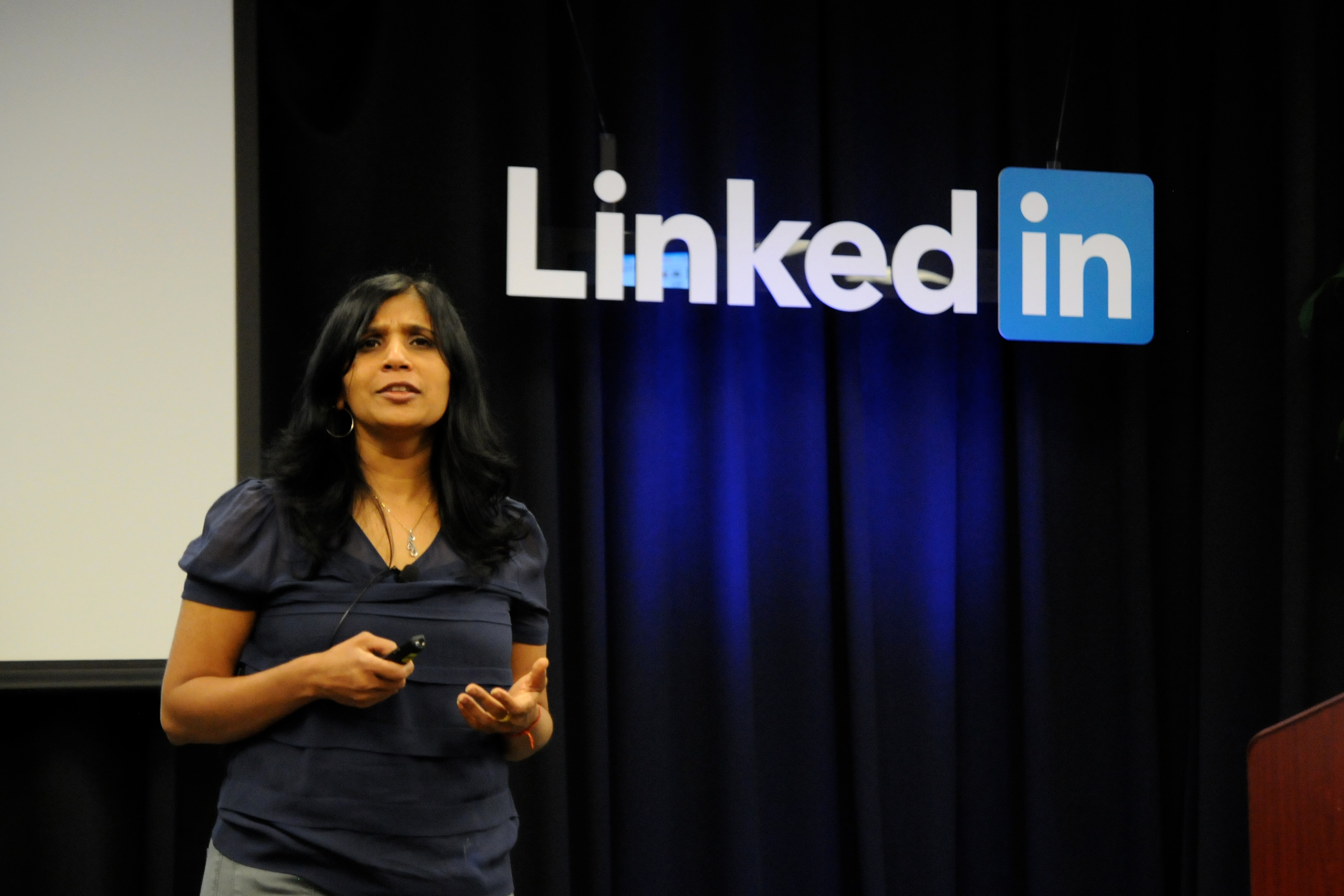
- Sinha at LinkedIn, 2012
- Born: Lucknow, India
- Citizenship: American
- Education: Allahabad University (M.A.); Brown University (PhD)
- Occupation: Businesswoman
- Employer: SlideShare
- Spouse: Jonathan Boutelle
- Awards: Most Powerful Women Entrepreneurs (Fortune)

Rashmi Sinha is an Indian American businesswoman who is known for co-founding SlideShare.

== Early life and education ==
Rashmi Sinha was born in Lucknow, India into a wealthy family. She studied psychology at Allahabad University, where she earned a B.A. and M.A. in psychology. Later, she moved to the United States and attended Brown University, where she earned a PhD in cognitive neuropsychology. There, Rashmi took computer science courses with Andy van Dam, so she had some exposure to the HCI (human-computer interaction) way of thinking. She took a course in designing educational software. Rashmi Sinha went to University of California, Berkeley for a postdoc where she switched her focus to human-computer interaction.

== Career ==
She then left academia at the University of California and later co-founded Uzanto. Simultaneously, Rashmi and her husband, with the help of her older brother Amit Ranjan, built SlideShare, a site for people to share presentations online, in just six months. Since its launch in 2006, more than 9 million presentations have been uploaded to SlideShare, helping professionals connect through content. LinkedIn acquired SlideShare for $118.75 million in 2012.

== Personal life ==
Sinha is married to Jonathan Boutelle, who is the co-founder and chief technology officer of SlideShare. They live in San Francisco. Sinha had 2 sons Rohan Boutelle and Vikram Boutelle who are twins who were born in the year 2012.

== Recognition ==
In 2008, Rashmi was named one of the World's Top 10 Women Influencers in Web 2.0 by Fast Company.

In 2012, Fortune named her No. 8 on its Most Powerful Women Entrepreneurs list. In 2008, Rashmi was named one of the World's Top 10 Women Influencers in Web 2.0 by Fast Company. In January 2015, The Economic Times listed her as one of 20 "most influential" global Indian women.

== See also ==
- List of Indian Americans
