= Tikhon Bernstam =

American Internet entrepreneur

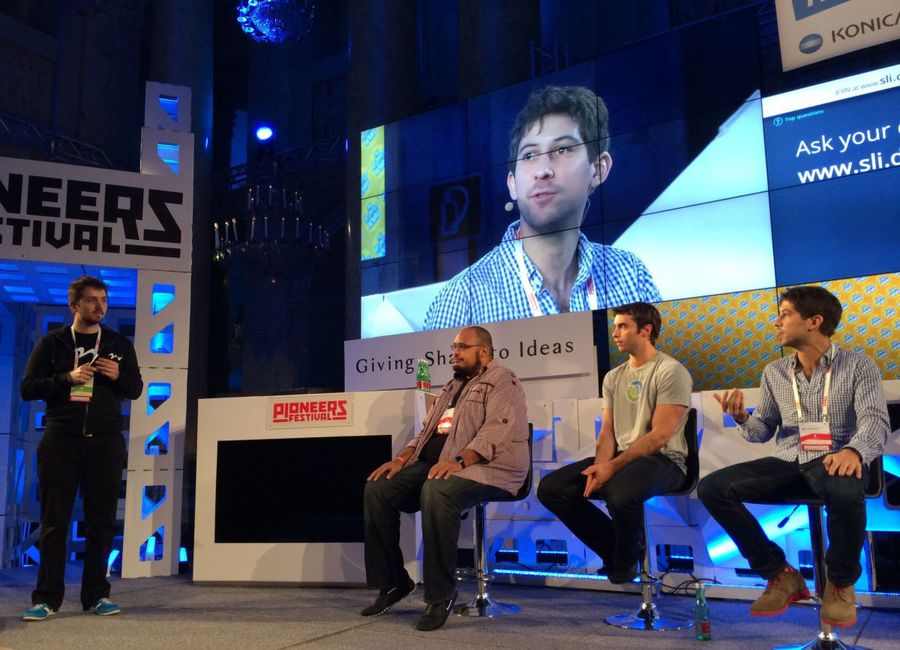
- Tikhon Bernstam speaking at Pioneers Festival in 2013 with Michael Seibel and Aaron Iba of Y Combinator
- Born: 1979 (age 46–47)
- Education: Dartmouth College (B.A.)
- Known for: Co-founding Parse.com and Scribd.com and Startup Angel Investing

Tikhon Bernstam (born 1979) is an American Internet entrepreneur who cofounded the companies Scribd and Parse.

== Background ==
Bernstam grew up in Palo Alto, California and then attended Dartmouth College, where he studied economics, computer science, and physics and graduated summa cum laude. Bernstam attended the Y Combinator program in 2006, launching Scribd. He went on to attend the Y Combinator program again in 2011, this time co-founding Parse, a platform to help mobile developers create mobile applications.

Bernstam is also an Angel investor and has invested in over 50 companies so far, including Optimizely, Scentbird and Crowdtilt.

In 2012, Business Insider named Bernstam one of the top 15 CEOs to watch.

== Scribd.com ==
In 2006, Tikhon Bernstam and partners Trip Adler and Jared Friedman started Scribd.

== Parse.com ==
Parse is a cloud application platform powering tens of thousands of apps, including those for Cadillac, the Green Bay Packers, Home Depot, and the Food Network.

Fast Company named Parse one of the top 50 most innovative companies of 2013.

Parse was founded in 2011 by Tikhon Bernstam, Ilya Sukhar, James Yu, and Kevin Lacker, a small group of seasoned Googlers and Y Combinator alums who got together to build a useful set of back-end tools for mobile developers. Parse offers services that help mobile developers store data in the cloud, manage identity log-ins, handle push notifications and run custom code in the cloud.

Facebook acquired Parse for $85 million in 2013.
