= Cureus =

Open access general medical journal with post-publication peer review

- Discipline: Medicine
- Language: English
- Edited by: John R. Adler, Alexander Muacevic

Publication details
- Former name: PeerEMed
- History: 2009–present
- Publisher: Springer Nature
- Frequency: Irregular
- Open access: Yes
- License: CC-BY 4.0
- Impact factor: 1.2 (2022)

Standard abbreviations
- ISO 4: Cureus

Indexing
- ISSN: 2168-8184
- LCCN: 2012200440

Links
- Journal homepage; Online archive

Cureus: Journal of Medical Science is a web-based open-access general medical journal that uses pre-publication peer-review and an optional post-publication peer review. Its founding editors-in-chief are John R. Adler (Stanford University) and Alexander Muacevic (LMU Munich).

According to Retraction Watch, the journal has a controversial reputation, in part because of many retractions, including a paper authored by the anti-vaccine conspiracy theorist Peter McCullough.

== History and publication process ==
The journal was originally started as PeerEMed in 2009, obtaining its current name in December 2012. Under its system, after an article has undergone pre-publication peer review and is published, anyone can review it through the use of Cureus' optional SIQ score, but the reviews of experts will be given a higher score. As of December 2022, the journal became part of the Springer Nature group of journals.

If certain criteria are met, Cureus does not charge publication fees.

== Abstracting and indexing ==
The journal has been abstracted and indexed in the Emerging Sources Citation Index. As of October 2025, the journal has been de-listed from indexation in the Web of Science. Cureus is indexed in PubMed Central, EBSCO, CNKI, Dimensions, and Google Scholar.

== Reception ==
Cureus's peer-review process involves asking experts to review a given article in a few days, resulting in its peer reviews taking much less time than most other journals. Adler told Retraction Watch in 2015:

Yes, Cureus has an unusually fast review process, which is an important part of the journal’s philosophy. We believe that post publication [sic] peer review, a focus of our journal through commenting and our unique SIQ process, is potentially a more powerful way to discern truth.

SIQ refers to Cureus's trademarked Scholarly Impact Quotient, a statistic calculated post-publication that takes peer opinions into account. Nevertheless, the speed and the quality of the journal's peer review process, as well as the article-level SIQ metric used by Cureus, has attracted the criticism of librarians and scientists who worry that the SIQ could be gamed.

In June 2022, Cureus was again criticized by Retraction Watch for republishing a previously retracted paper. The original paper, published on 19 July 2021 in Frontiers in Medicine, had been retracted due to methodological issues and concerns regarding potential violations of medical ethics and human rights related to a COVID-19 proxalutamide trial in Brazil.

Earlier, in April 2022, Cureus displayed a 'wall of shame' to "highlight authors who have committed egregious ethical violations as well as the institutions that enabled them". The feature faced criticism for potentially placing undue emphasis on individuals, especially corresponding authors; it was removed from the site in May 2023. Also in April 2022, Cureus published notes of concern relating to nearly 50 papers published without the knowledge of the corresponding author or with disputed authorship. In January 2024, 56 papers were retracted.

In 2024, the journal published a paper by the anti vaccine activist Peter A. McCullough on COVID-19 vaccinations, which was later retracted.

In November 2024, after having previously defended them, Cureus closed six of its "academic channels." Numerous sources have associated these channels with research paper mills, but the journal maintains editorial control over all channel submissions.

In 2025, Clarivate removed Cureus from its Master Journal List, which according to Retraction Watch, means it will no longer be indexed in Web of Science or receive an impact factor.
