= Laurent Leksell =

Swedish economist

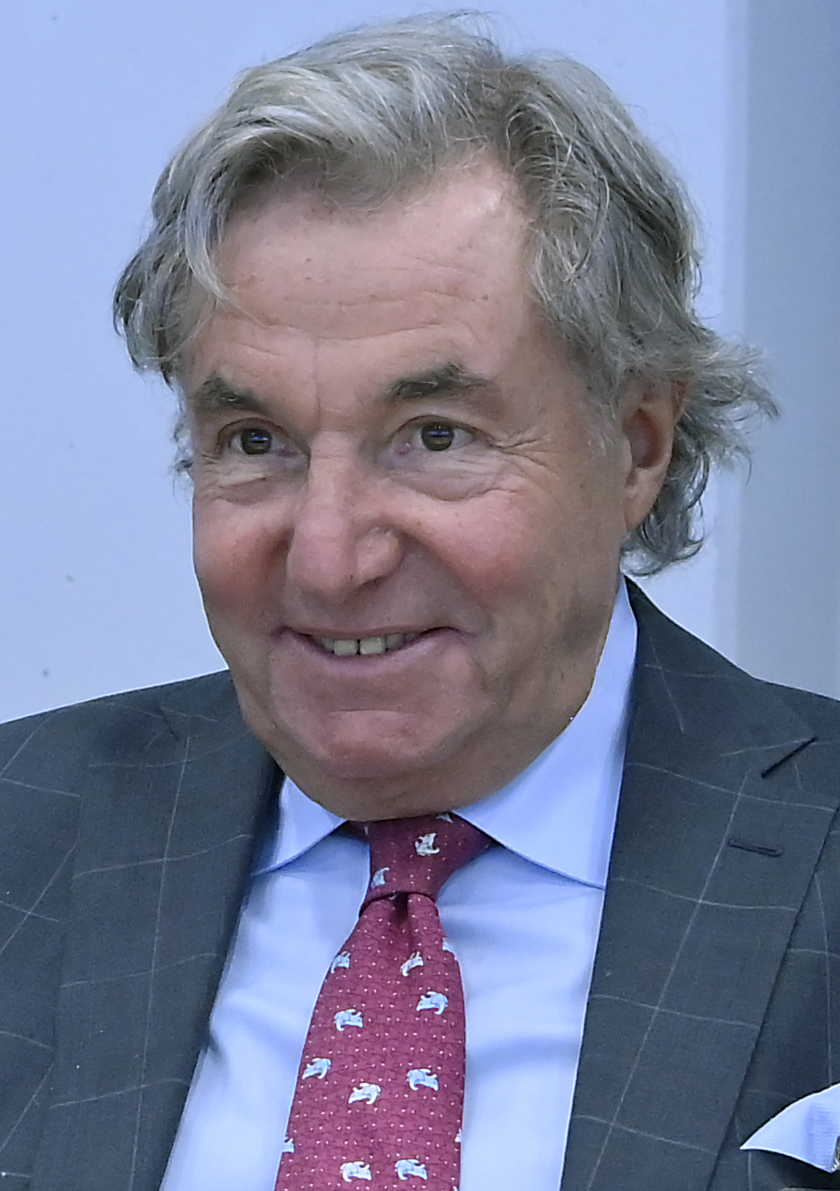
Laurent Leksell in 2023

Laurent Leksell (born in 1952) is a Swedish professor of economics, international business leader and entrepreneur.

With his father, Lars, Laurent Leksell jointly founded Elekta AB in 1972, while he was still a student of the Stockholm School of Economics to exploit the Gamma Knife his father had invented. Elekta is a Swedish med-tech enterprise specialised in the treatment of cancer and neurosurgical conditions. Laurent Leksell held the role of CEO of Elekta between 1972 and 2005. Today he is Chairman of the Board and a principal shareholder of the company listed on the OMX Stockholm Stock Exchange.

== Biography ==
Born in Lund, Sweden, Leksell is second youngest of five children of Professor Lars Leksell (1907–1986), professor in neurosurgery at the Karolinska Institute in Stockholm. Lars Leksell invented the Gamma knife for radiation therapy, which became the genesis of Elekta AB. Laurent Leksell's mother was born Ludmilla Soboutian (1912–1965), of Armenian-Iranian descent.

The Leksell Family moved from Lund to Stockholm in 1959 where Laurent Leksell attended Broms skola, private school. In 1968 he enrolled at the Sigtunaskolan boarding school, graduating 3 years later. In 1971 he commenced his university studies at Stockholm School of Economics, a year before founding Elekta AB. Between 1973 and 1974 he served as a conscript in the Swedish Army with a role in communications intelligence. In 1974 Laurent Leksell graduated with a Master of Science from Stockholm School of Economics.

In 1979 Laurent Leksell married Marianne, born Åström. They have four children, Gustaf, Caroline, Erik and Richard.

== Academic career ==
After graduating Stockholm School of Economics in 1974 Laurent Leksell commenced an academic career as researcher and teacher with his alma mater at the institute for corporate management (today IFL Executive Education). He served there between 1974 and 1981. 1978-1979 Laurent Leksell served as assistant Professor in international finance at the University of Hawaii, USA. 1978-1979 he spent time as a visiting scholar at Harvard Business School, Boston, USA. In 1979 Laurent Leksell presented his doctor's thesis “Management of subsidiary-headquarter relationships in Multinational Corporations” at the management school Insead, Fontainbleu, France and consequently awarded Doctor of Economics at Stockholm School of Economics in 1979. He served as assistant professor in business strategy and management at Insead between 1979-1980. The same year he left his academic position at Stockholm School of Economics to found an international consultancy for management, finance and strategy, Nordic Management AB.

== Entrepreneurship ==
Laurent Leksell founded Nordic Management AB in 1981 together with Kjell Spångberg and Ulf Lindgren, serving a Swedish as well as international clients. Laurent Leksell sold his shares in the firm in 1986 to the other Partners in order to focus on developing Elekta AB. At the time Elekta had a yearly turnover of 2 million SEK. That same year, the first Elekta Gamma Knife was installed at the University of Pittsburgh Medical Center. The enterprise had 4 employees at the time. In 1994 Elekta was listed on the OMX Stockholm Stock Exchange. In 2017 the turnover was 10,7 billion SEK and the organization employed 4000 people. In 2015 Laurent Leksell handed over the reins as CEO to Tomas Puusepp, Laurent Leksell retaining his seat on the board, becoming chairman in 2013.

Laurent Leksell and Family made Bonit Capital (AB Bonit Invest, 1955) their family office. The organisation invests internationally across sectors and asset classes with a focus on innovation and sustainability in the private sector.

Laurent Leksell and Family founded the philanthropic arm of Bonit Capital, Leksell Social Ventures AB, in 2014.

In 2018 Laurent Leksell published his autobiography “Radiant Times – How I turned Elekta into an international enterprise” (Sv. “Strålande Tider - Hur jag gjorde Elekta till ett världsföretag”). The book depicts the Leksell Family history, his academic career and the founding of Elekta and other enterprises.

== Philanthropy ==
Between 2005-2015 Laurent Leksell served as the Chairman of the Board of Stockholm Stadsmission, an organization founded in 1853 today serving socioeconomically exposed individuals. In 2014 Laurent Leksell and family founded Leksell Social Ventures, a social impact investment company focusing on financing social innovation and enterprise in Sweden. This is the principal expression of the Leksell Family philanthropic endeavors and focuses on topics such as mental health, education and inclusion of foreign born migrants and youth. Leksell Social Ventures was awarded Welfare Innovator if the Year 2016 by Newspaper Dagens Samhalle at their annual gala for pioneering the first Social Impact Bond in Sweden together with Norrkoping Municipality, aiming to support children placed in foster care.

== Board roles ==
- Elekta AB - Member of the Board since 1972, Chairman since 2013
- Stockholms Stadsmission – Chairman of the Board 2005-2015
- Leksell Social Ventures – Chairman of the Board since 2014
- International Chamber of Commerce (ICC Sweden) – Member of the Board since 2015
- Stockholm School of Economics – Member of the Board since 2017, Chairman since 2018

== Awards ==
- Swedish Entrepreneur of the Year, 2007, Ernst & Young Sweden
- Gold Medal, 2010, Swedish Royal Academy of Sciences (Kungliga Vetenskapsakademien, IVA)
- Medal of Enterprise, 2011, Royal Patriotic Society
- Medal of His Majesty King Carl XVI Gustaf of Sweden, 2013, The Royal Court of Sweden
