= Hällesåker =

- Location within Västra Götaland Location within Sweden
- Coordinates: 57°36′N 13°10′E
- Country: Sweden
- Province: Halland
- County: Västra Götaland County
- Municipality: Mölndal Municipality

Area
  - Total: 0.64 km^{2} (0.25 sq mi)

Population (31 December 2010)
  - Total: 357
  - Density: 555/km^{2} (1,440/sq mi)
- Time zone: UTC+1 (CET)
  - Summer (DST): UTC+2 (CEST)

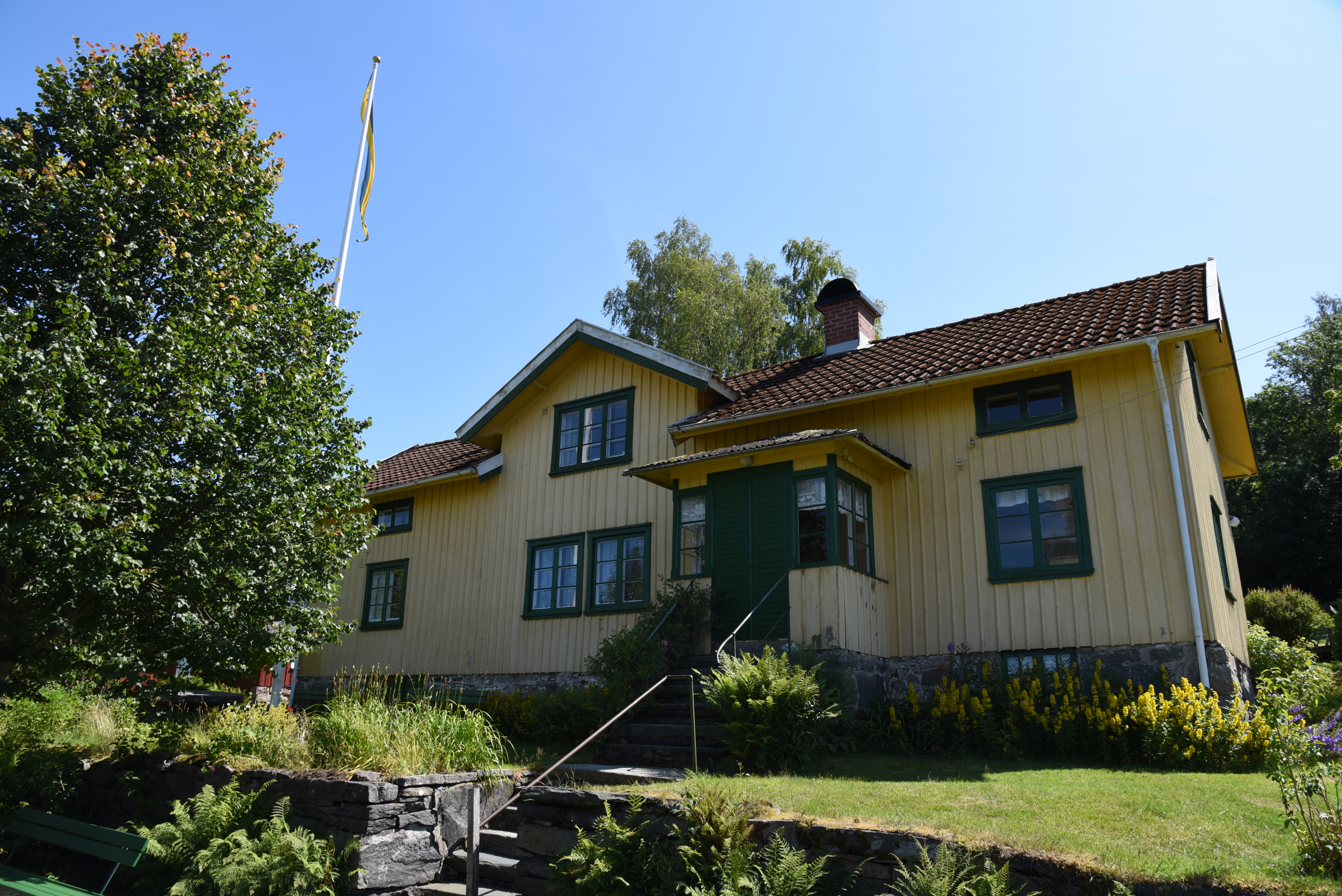
Börjesgården in Hällesåker

Hällesåker is a locality situated in Mölndal Municipality, Västra Götaland County, Sweden with 357 inhabitants in 2010.
