= Reno CyberKnife =

Cancer treatment center in Nevada, USA

- Industry: Healthcare
- Founded: October 2008
- Headquarters: 654 N. Arlington Avenue, Reno, Nevada, United States
- Key people: Medical Director: Jonathan Tay

Reno CyberKnife is a cancer treatment center in Reno, Nevada specializing in stereotactic radiosurgery. The center is a service of Saint Mary’s Regional Medical Center and is also a part of Saint Mary’s Brain Tumor Center. Reno CyberKnife is the only provider of CyberKnife technology in northern Nevada and frequently treats prostate and lung cancers and brain tumors.

== Key people ==
Dr. Jonathan Tay

Dr. Jonathan Tay is the medical director of Reno CyberKnife. He is an active clinical investigator and has conducted research on prostate cancer and treatments. Under his leadership, Reno CyberKnife has developed cancer clinical trials and implemented a variety of prostate cancer therapies. Dr. Tay also was named one of Nevada Business Magazine’s 2010 “Health Care Heroes” for his contributions to the medical field.

Dr. Hilari Fleming

Dr. Hilari Fleming is one of three female neurosurgeons in the West. She is a graduate of the University of North Carolina at Chapel Hill. She also holds a doctorate in genetics from the University of Pennsylvania. Her expertise includes treatment of brain tumors.

In 2010, Dr. Fleming and Dr. Tay were among the founding doctors of Saint Mary’s Brain Tumor Center. The center was the region’s first brain tumor center. Reno CyberKnife provides all stereotactic radiosurgery treatment for Saint Mary’s Brain Tumor Center patients who are candidates.

== Clinical research and training ==
The Reno CyberKnife team has published two clinical studies focused on the treatment of prostate cancer using CyberKnife. The studies are titled, “Prostate CyberKnife Stereotactic Body Radiotherapy: Report on the Early Experience at a Community-based CyberKnife Center” Year 1 and Year 2.

In February 2012, a group of physicians from Mexico City traveled to the U.S. and were trained by the Reno CyberKnife staff to prepare for the arrival of the second CyberKnife machine in Mexico and the first sponsored by a government program.
