= Fässberg Parish =

- Fässbergs församling
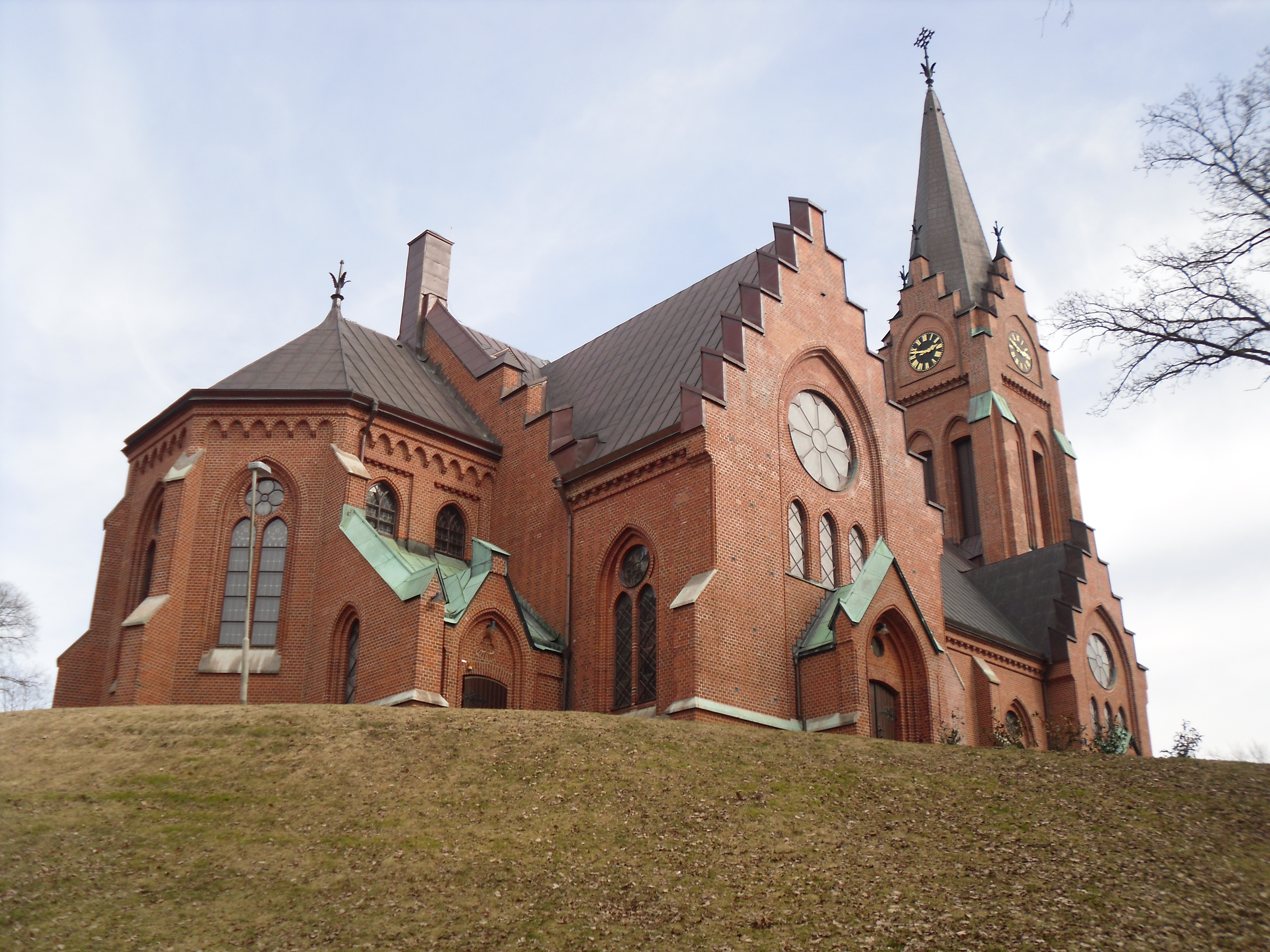
- Fässberg Church
- Fässberg Parish
- 57°39′23″N 12°00′35″E
- Location: Mölndal, Västra Götaland
- Country: Sweden
- Denomination: Church of Sweden

History
- Founded: Middle Ages

Administration
- Diocese: Diocese of Gothenburg

Fässberg Parish is a parish in the Diocese of Gothenburg in Sweden. It covers most of the town of Mölndal.

== See also ==
- Fässbergs IF
