= Skoglund =

Skoglund is a surname which originated in Norway and Sweden. Notable people with the surname include:

- Albin Skoglund (born 1997), Swedish footballer
- Aleksander Skoglund (born 1999), Norwegian Nordic combined skier
- Alexandra Skoglund (1862–1938), Swedish politician, suffragette and women's rights activist
- Andreas Skoglund (born 2001) Norwegian Nordic combined skier
- Ann-Louise Skoglund (born 1962), Swedish retired track and field hurdler
- Bob Skoglund (1925–1949), American football defensive end
- Bosse Skoglund (Bo Åke Skoglund, 1936–2021), Swedish musician
- Carl Skoglund (1884–1960), Swedish-American socialist
- Claës Skoglund (1916–2008), Swedish major general
- Eric Skoglund (born 1992), American baseball player
- Erik Skoglund (1903–1984), Swedish swimmer
- Erik Skoglund (born 1991), Swedish boxer
- Evert Skoglund (born 1953), Italian former footballer
- Gösta Skoglund (1903–1988), Swedish social democrat politician
- Gunnar Skoglund (1899–1983), Swedish film director, editor and screenwriter
- Harald Skoglund Klungtveit (born 1982), Norwegian journalist
- Hampus Skoglund (born 2004), Swedish footballer
- Howell Pomeroy Skoglund (1903–1977), American businessman
- John Anders Skoglund (born 1971), Norwegian retired footballer (striker)
- Karl-Evert Skoglund, ("Ya", born 1938), Swedish former footballer
- Kenneth Skoglund (born 1953), Norwegian sport shooter
- Kim Skoglund (born 1987), Swedish footballer
- Klara Amalie Skoglund (1891–1978), Norwegian politician for the Labour Party
- Lars Skoglund (born 1974), Norwegian composer and musician
- Lennart Skoglund ("Nacka", 1929–1975), Swedish footballer
- Marilyn Skoglund (born 1946), American former judge
- Martin Skoglund ("Doverstorparen", 1892–1976), Swedish politician
- Mikael Skoglund (born 1969), Swedish academic
- Nicolai Skoglund (born 2003), Norwegian footballer
- Nils Skoglund (1906–1980), Swedish diver who competed in the 1920 Summer Olympics
- Olof Skoglund (1925–2018), Swedish diplomat
- Pete Skoglund (1905–1968), New Zealand lawn bowls competitor and brother of Philip Skoglund
- Phil Skoglund (1937–2015), New Zealand lawn bowls competitor and son of Philip Skoglund
- Philip Skoglund (1899–1975), New Zealand politician of the Labour Party and a cabinet minister
- Pontus Skoglund (born 1984), Swedish population geneticist
- Rolf Skoglund (1940–2022), Swedish actor
- Sandy Skoglund (born 1946), American photographer and installation artist
- Sunniva Skoglund (born 2002), Norwegian footballer
- Thomas Skoglund (born 1983), Norwegian handball player
- Vincent Skoglund (born 1974), Swedish photographer
- Wes Skoglund (born 1945), American politician serving in Minnesota
