= Lars Leksell =

Swedish pioneering physician (1907–1986)

- Born: 24 November 1907; Fässberg, Sweden
- Died: 12 January 1986 (aged 78); Switzerland
- Education: Karolinska Institute
- Years active: 1935–1974
- Known for: Invention of Radiosurgery.
- Children: Laurent Leksell
- Medical career
- Profession: Surgeon, Physician
- Institutions: University of Lund
- Sub-specialties: Neurosurgery, Neurophysiology

Lars Leksell (24 November 1907 – 12 January 1986) was a Swedish physician and professor of Neurosurgery at the Karolinska Institute in Stockholm, Sweden. He was the inventor of radiosurgery.

== Life and career ==
Lars Leksell was born in Fässberg Parish, Sweden on 24 November 1907. He completed medical studies at the Karolinska Institute and began his neurosurgical training in 1935 under Herbert Olivecrona. Development of electronystagmography and his thesis on muscular control and gamma motor neurons were his early scientific achievements. In 1949, he developed his arc centered stereotactic frame based on a polar coordinate system. In 1951, using the Uppsala University cyclotron, Leksell and the physicist and radiobiologist Borje Larsson, developed the concept of radiosurgery. Leksell and Larsson first employed proton beams coming from several directions into a small area into the brain, in experiments in animals and in the first treatments of human patients. This achieved a new non-invasive method of destroying discrete regions within the brain while minimizing the effect on the surrounding tissues. He became a professor of surgery at University of Lund in 1958. From 1960 until his retirement, in 1974, he was Professor & Chairman of neurosurgery at the Karolinska Institute in Stockholm, succeeding Herbert Olivecrona, who was the department's founder in 1920.

During this time Leksell pursued his work on stereotactic radiosurgery and refinement of stereotactic methods. The prototype of the gamma knife was installed in Sophiahemmet in 1968. Over the rest of his career, Leksell used it to treat 762 patients. Throughout this time he would propose improving radiosurgery with modern imaging modalities including CT, MRI and angiography, as later used. Leksell's technique is an effective treatment for many conditions such as arteriovenous malformations, pituitary tumors, acoustic neuromas, craniopharyngiomas, meningioma, metastatic and skull base tumors, and primary brain tumors. The device is manufactured by Elekta Instruments, Inc., a Swedish company which manufactures stereotactic surgery and radiosurgery equipment, based on the inventions of Leksell. It was founded by him in 1972. He died at age of 78 in 1986 while taking a brisk walk in the Swiss Alps.

== First years and the "stereotactic frame" ==
Leksell started his neurosurgical training with Herbert Olivecrona in 1935 at the Serafimer Hospital, one of the oldest hospitals in Sweden founded in 1752. The Olivecrona neurosurgical service enjoyed a solid international reputation and attracted a large number of trainees from all over the world. For a short period Leksell served as a volunteer medical doctor in Finland when it was attacked by the Soviet Union in November 1939. Later he told that during that war, he often speculated on the possibility of extracting bullets from the brain with minimal damage to the surrounding brain tissue using a mechanically guided instrument.

In the early 1940s Leksell joined Ragnar Granit, Nobel Laureate 1967, for experimental studies in neurophysiology. In 1945 he presented a PhD dissertation, a monograph on the motor gamma system titled ‘‘The action potential and excitatory effects of the small ventral root fibers to skeletal muscle.’’ This was a major milestone in the understanding of muscle control and has now become part of basic neurophysiology. During these years he, together with Granit and Skoglund, made another major contribution by describing the phenomenon of ephapsis, ‘‘artificial synapses,’’ caused by local pressure on a nerve, as a possible mechanism involved in trigeminal neuralgia.

After resuming clinical work, he started work on the development of a stereotactic instrument. The stereotactic method is the product of Robert Clarke, an engineer, physiologist and surgeon, who, together with neurosurgeon Victor Horsley, devised an instrument for simulating and making lesions at exact locations within the brains of experimental animals: the Horsley–Clarke apparatus. Clarke came up with the concept in 1895, and the original device was constructed in 1905 and first used in 1906.

The first successful cranial application of stereotactic surgery in humans is credited to the team of Ernest Spiegel and Henry Wycis in the Department of Experimental Neurology at Temple University in Philadelphia (Spiegel et al. 1947). Their original frame, using a Cartesian coordinate systems and similar in design and operation to the Clarke-Horsley device, was fixed to a patient's head by means of a plaster cast. The frame and cast were removable, allowing separate imaging and surgery sessions. Contrast radiography, ventriculography and later pneumoencephalography permitted the visualization of intracranial reference points from which the location of target structures of interest could be determined. Initial applications were for psychosurgery.

In 1947 Leksell visited Wycis in Philadelphia and then developed and described his instrument in a publication in 1949. This was the first example of a stereotactic system based on the principle of ‘‘center-of-arc’’. In contrast to the Cartesian coordinate system of the Spiegel-Wycis device, Leksell's frame utilized three polar coordinates (angle, depth and anterior–posterior location). This ‘‘arc-quadrant’’ device provided maximum flexibility in choosing probe entry point and trajectory, and was therefore much easier to use. The frame has been modified over the ensuing years, but remains remarkably similar in function and appearance to the original 1949 device. The use of a movable semi-arc with an electrode carrier implies that the tip of a probe can reach the target regardless of the position of the carrier or the angling of the arc relative to the skull fixation device, a frame or base plate with bars for bone fixation screws. This construction permits also transsphenoidal, straight lateral and suboccipital probe approaches. Leksell was in many respects a perfectionist and for the rest of his life he continued to change and revise the design of virtually every small part of his instrument though the basic semicircular frame was retained. He focused not only on upgrading the function of the instrument but also on its aesthetic appearance. An important feature was that ‘‘the apparatus should be easy to handle and practical in routine clinical work’’ and ‘‘a high degree of exactitude is necessary.’’ An oft-cited quotation is ‘‘Tools used by the surgeon must be adapted to the task and where the human brain is concerned, no tool can be too refined.’’

The first, documented clinical application of Leksell's stereotactic system was a case of a craniopharyngioma cyst that was punctured and treated with injection of radioactive phosphorus. that patient was probably the first patient in the world to undergo this form of therapy (1948). Before the advent of modern imaging techniques (CT, MRI), ventriculography was, and in some centers still is, routinely utilized for target coordinate determination. Already in the late 1940s neuroradiology was a well-developed speciality at the Serafimer Hospital and angiography and pneumoencephalography were routinely practiced. Leksell performed pneumoencephalography, first in the sitting and then in the supine position to visualize the anterior and posterior commissures, respectively. In order to compensate for the divergence of the X-rays, he constructed a diagram of tightly packed concentric circles, approximated to spirals, geometrically related to the divergence and the distance between the X-ray tube and the film, and frame planes, for determining the target coordinates; it has to be admitted, however, that in contrast to Leksell's other inventions many surgeons found it difficult to understand and use this diagram.

Beside the passionate interest in the technical aspects of stereotaxy, Leksell was in the 1950s and 1960s very active in the operation theatre. He performed a large number of pallidotomies, and later also thalamotomies, in Parkinson's disease and capsulotomies in various forms of mental disorders. The results of a series of 81 patients subjected to pallidotomy was published in 1960, and 116 patients treated with capsulotomy were reported in 1961.

Tools used by the surgeon must be adapted to the task and where the human brain is concerned, no tool can be too refined.

— Lars Leksell

== Radiosurgery ==
The term and concept of radiosurgery were introduced by Leksell already in 1951 when he reasoned that the ‘‘center-of-arc’’ principle and his first stereotactic instrument were suitable for replacing a probe (needle electrode) by cross-firing intracerebral structures with narrow beams of radiant energy. X-rays were first tried but both gamma rays and ultrasonics were included as alternatives.

Initial experiments were performed on cats and then a few patients with pain and chronic psychosis were treated with a 280 kV X-ray tube attached to the arc. Of particular interest is that in 1953 two cases of trigeminal neuralgia were treated and at follow up in 1971 they were still free of pain.

In 1946 Leksell was appointed head of a neurosurgical unit in Lund in southern Sweden where he became professor in 1958 and remained so until 1960. In those days there were very few neurosurgeons around the world who were active in stereotactic surgery and the international network was very small; it is of interest that the Schalten brand and Bailey's Stereotactic Atlas was partly based on some brain specimens supplied by Leksell. While in Lund, Leksell was apparently able to evade many of his clinical obligations because he was able to initiate a close collaboration with a team of physicists led by Börje Larsson at the University of Uppsala (north of Stockholm) where a synchrocyclotron was available.

They conducted experiments with stereotactic high-energy proton irradiation in goats resulting in a seminal publication in Nature in 1958. This technique was also applied in a few patients with Parkinson's disease (pallidotomy), psychiatric disorder (capsulotomy) and pain (mesencephalotomy). Although precisely placed and well-limited lesions could be produced by the focused proton beams, as demonstrated in a few autopsy cases, the synchrocyclotron proved to be too complicated for general clinical use. This compelled Leksell to consider other radiation sources and he started designing the cobalt-60 gamma unit, which was fully integrated with the stereotactic system. The development of the ‘‘beam-knife’’ took place after Leksell had been appointed successor to Olivecrona in 1960 and the first unit was inaugurated in 1967. Later the same year reports of the two first cases, patients with cancer related pain subjected to radiosurgical thalamotomy, were published. Originally, radiosurgery and the gamma unit were developed with the hope that it would offer a bloodless, and less risky, method to be applied principally in functional neurosurgery, for example in thalamotomy for Parkinson's disease. On the other hand, Leksell had always considered his stereotactic instrument a surgical tool that should also be utilized in general neurosurgery in order to enhance precision and minimize hazards. This idea had to some extent been realized by the extensive use of stereotactic technique in puncturing cysts and also in performing biopsies in critical regions. The gamma unit soon proved to be useful in the treatment of some diseases previously requiring neurosurgery, such as pituitary adenomas, acoustic neurinomas and arteriovenous malformations. This use of radiosurgery has revolutionized the management of these conditions but was met with skepticism from the neurosurgical community.

Two other examples of Leksell's innovation deserve to be mentioned. He was the first to apply ultrasound in neurosurgical diagnosis by the development of echoencephalography as early as 1955. Moreover, his double action rongeur has become an indispensable tool in the hands of most neurosurgeons.

== Bibliography ==
- Leksell L. - The action potential and excitatory effects of the small ventral root fibres to skeletal muscle (1945), Acta Physiol Scandinavica
- Leksell L. - The stereotaxic method and radiosurgery of the brain (1951), Acta Chirurgica Scandinavica
- Leksell L. - A stereotaxic apparatus for intracerebral surgery (1949), Acta Chirurgica Scandinavica
- Lozano A. et al. - Textbook of Stereotactic, Funct. Neurosurgery (2009), Berlin, pp. 3229
- Timothy D. Solberg, Robert L. Siddon, and Brian Kavanagh - Historical Development of Stereotactic Ablative Radiotherapy(2012), Springer, Berlin, pp. 35
