= Oncology information system =

Type of software

Oncology Information System (OIS) is a software solution that manages departmental, administrative and clinical activities in cancer care. It aggregates information into a complete oncology-specific electronic health record to support medical information management. The OIS allows the capture of patient history information, the documentation of the treatment response, medical prescription of the treatment, the storage of patient documentation and the capture of activities for billing purposes.

Unlike a hospital information system (HIS), which is intended to manage patient records more generally, or radiological information system (RIS), intended to track and manage radiology requests and workflow, the OIS supports the delivery of integrated care and long-term treatment for cancer patients by collecting data during various phases of treatment, maintaining a history of treatment fractions, screening, prevention, diagnosis, image reviews, palliative care and end-of-life care. An OIS will be designed around the specific requirements of chemotherapy, radiotherapy and other supportive activities.

== Basic features of an OIS ==
OIS generally support the following features:

- Treatment workflow
- Doctor's prescription
- Patient register
- Management of the treatment schedule
- Management of patient documents
- Financial control
- Health Level 7(HL7) and DICOM RT interoperability
