= Mölndal Municipality =

Mölndal Municipality Mölndals kommun
- Municipality
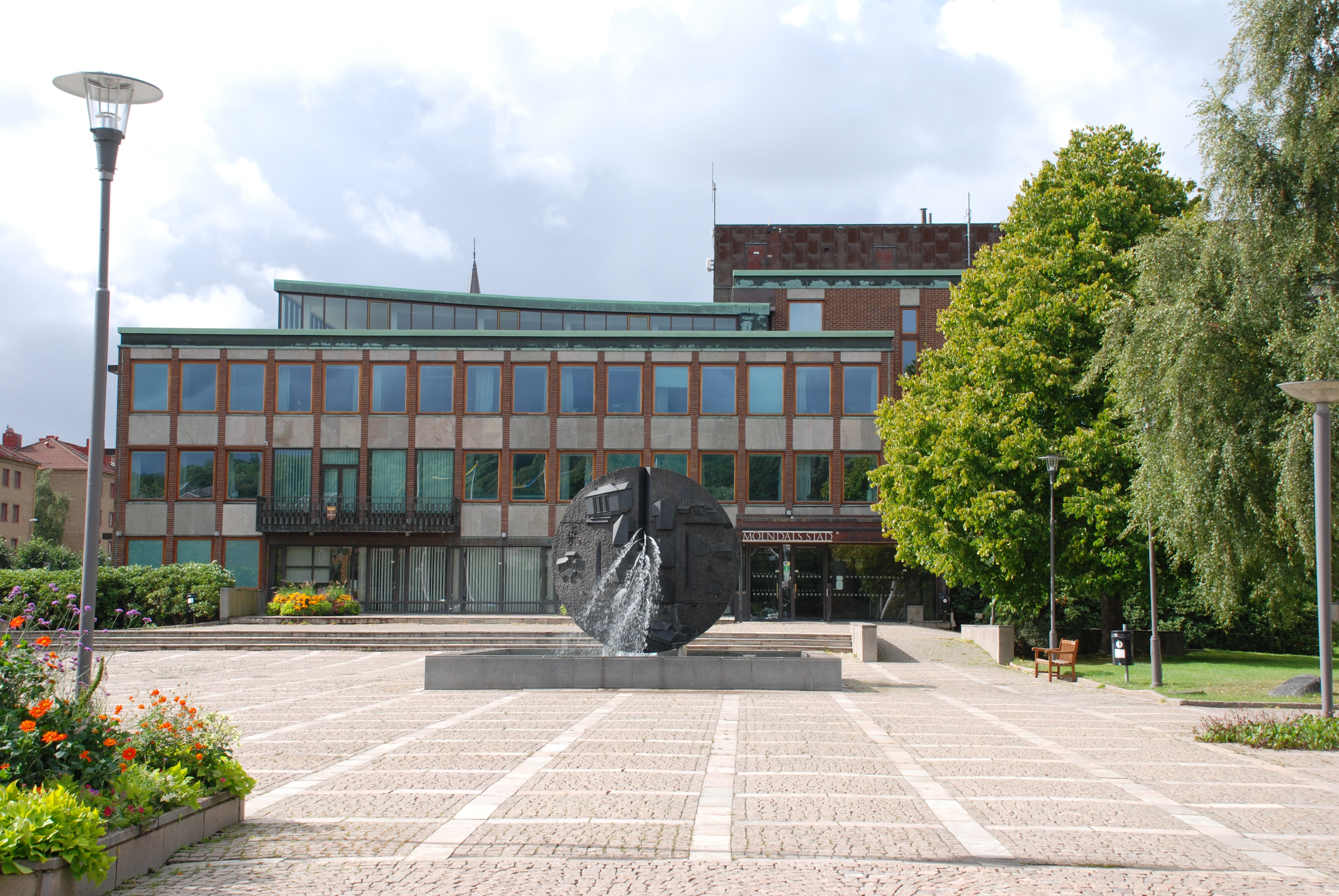
- Mölndal City Hall

- Coat of arms

- Coordinates: 57°42′N 11°58′E
- Country: Sweden
- County: Västra Götaland County
- Seat: Mölndal

Area
  - Total: 152.28 km^{2} (58.80 sq mi)
  - Land: 145.84 km^{2} (56.31 sq mi)
  - Water: 6.44 km^{2} (2.49 sq mi)
- Area as of 1 January 2014.

Population (December 31, 2019)
  - Total: 69,364
  - Density: 475.62/km^{2} (1,231.8/sq mi)
- Time zone: UTC+1 (CET)
  - Summer (DST): UTC+2 (CEST)
- ISO 3166 code: SE
- Province: Västergötland and Halland
- Municipal code: 1481
- Website: www.molndal.se
- Density is calculated using land area only.

Mölndal Municipality (Swedish: Mölndals kommun, semi-officially Mölndals stad) is a municipality in Västra Götaland in western Sweden, just south of Gothenburg. Its seat is located in Mölndal, which lies within the Gothenburg urban area, and the whole municipality is part of Metropolitan Gothenburg.

In 1911 a municipalsamhälle (a kind of borough within a rural municipality, handling matters of urban character) named Mölndal was instituted in the municipality of Fässberg. In 1922 Fässberg was made the City of Mölndal. In 1971 it was amalgamated with Kållered and Lindome (the latter transferred from Halland County). At the same time it became a municipality of unitary type, like all others in the country. The municipality prefers, however, to style itself Mölndals stad (City of Mölndal) as a semi-official name whenever legally possible. This usage has no effect on the status of the municipality.

== Localities ==
The municipality has four main parts: Mölndal, Kållered, Lindome and Hällesåker.

- Mölndal has 37,131 inhabitants (a part of the contiguous Gothenburg urban area)
- Kållered has 7,257 inhabitants
- Lindome has 13,364 inhabitants
- Hällesåker has 900 inhabitants

Numbers from 2003.

== Demographics ==
This is a demographic table based on Mölndal Municipality's electoral districts in the 2022 Swedish general election sourced from SVT's election platform, in turn taken from SCB official statistics.

In total there were 69,838 residents, including 51,607 Swedish citizens of voting age. 48.5% voted for the left coalition and 50.1% for the right coalition. Indicators are in percentage points except population totals and income.

Location	Residents	Citizen adults	Left vote	Right vote	Employed	Swedish parents	Foreign heritage	Income SEK	Degree
Location			%	%					
Almås	1,675	1,222	50.5	48.2	79	74	26	27,269	45
Balltorp V	2,112	1,477	40.3	57.7	83	72	28	31,212	45
Balltorp Ö	1,375	925	49.7	47.9	76	61	39	26,244	44
Bosgården N	1,318	1,003	47.4	50.7	84	67	33	28,782	62
Bosgården S	1,419	1,158	54.1	44.0	78	74	26	25,946	55
Brattås N	1,829	1,362	47.3	50.2	76	59	41	24,639	39
Brattås S	1,861	1,343	53.4	45.5	87	75	25	30,345	57
Broslätt V	1,333	1,027	50.0	48.6	75	73	27	25,519	52
Broslätt Ö	1,694	1,418	52.8	45.1	84	65	35	27,486	55
Ekhaga	1,229	919	48.6	49.7	79	70	30	29,434	63
Eklanda V	1,796	1,147	45.4	54.4	85	79	21	35,017	63
Eklanda Ö	1,895	1,140	51.7	47.7	91	83	17	41,497	77
Fässberg V	1,344	1,052	55.4	42.9	83	72	28	27,074	55
Fässberg Ö	1,348	1,037	52.0	46.8	79	72	28	27,513	56
Glasberget N	1,413	1,070	57.6	40.8	86	90	10	33,334	64
Glasberget S	1,439	1,054	53.5	45.8	83	83	17	29,662	55
Hallen N	1,306	964	44.1	54.7	87	77	23	31,107	59
Hallen S	1,494	1,029	43.3	55.1	84	77	23	30,306	51
Hällesåker	1,875	1,409	35.7	63.1	87	87	13	30,074	35
Krokslätt N	1,160	935	49.5	48.8	81	68	32	30,527	63
Krokslätt S	1,477	1,142	52.7	45.9	86	68	32	29,764	60
Kvarnbyn N	1,314	967	51.8	47.0	78	72	28	27,358	57
Kvarnbyn S	1,722	1,333	47.7	51.3	87	74	26	33,085	63
Lackarebäck N	1,586	1,169	46.1	53.5	85	83	17	38,467	77
Lackarebäck S	1,737	1,306	50.5	48.7	88	87	13	37,074	73
Rävekärr N	1,677	1,192	50.6	48.7	80	75	25	32,515	61
Rävekärr S	1,641	1,168	49.9	49.0	79	69	31	27,291	48
Sinntorp N	1,672	1,283	43.1	56.0	87	86	14	30,349	49
Sinntorp V	1,292	957	47.5	51.0	86	81	19	29,888	50
Sinntorp Ö	1,651	1,248	44.2	55.1	85	86	14	30,274	46
Skånhälla Bräcka	1,363	1,064	43.8	55.1	86	83	17	32,349	58
Skånhälla Fågelsten	1,531	1,008	43.6	55.1	87	85	15	31,933	55
Skånhälla V	1,514	1,095	38.4	59.8	88	86	14	33,080	52
Stadshuset N	1,314	1,156	47.5	50.9	85	74	26	30,573	60
Stadshuset S	1,416	1,053	53.3	46.4	79	65	35	26,012	58
Stallbacken V	1,293	937	42.1	56.9	87	71	29	33,282	61
Stallbacken Ö	1,176	867	42.9	55.8	87	67	33	31,744	57
Stretered	1,922	1,320	47.1	52.5	88	80	20	34,287	58
Sörgården V	1,479	1,233	51.5	46.8	77	77	23	30,032	74
Sörgården Ö	1,388	976	51.3	47.7	82	79	21	35,816	74
Toltorp N	1,533	1,068	46.4	52.4	83	78	22	37,942	79
Toltorp S	1,453	881	52.1	46.7	83	77	23	32,592	76
Valås	1,487	1,109	48.3	50.6	89	83	17	31,134	59
Västerberg	1,569	1,414	56.4	40.6	76	58	42	24,492	52
Åby V	1,419	1,085	51.3	47.2	80	59	41	26,294	47
Åby Ö	1,300	885	53.8	42.6	82	65	35	27,086	45
Source: SVT

== Sights of interest ==
- Gunnebo House from the 18th century.
- Fässberg Church from the 19th century

== Notable residents ==
- Lars Leksell (1907–1986), physician and neurosurgeon

== Sister cities ==
As of September 2023, Mölndal has no twin cities.

== See also ==
- Eklanda
- Forsåker
