= Niklas Savander =

Finnish businessman

Niklas Savander (born 4 August 1962 in Helsinki, Finland) is a Finnish businessman currently active as a Chairman and Private Equity adviser. Savander was previously President and CEO of Elekta AB a Swedish listed company focused on Cancer treatment systems. Before his Elekta presidency Savander was the Executive Vice President of the markets unit of Nokia Corporation. Savander became a member of the Nokia Group executive Board in 2006, having joined the company in 1997.

Savander was the deputy Chairman of the Board of Directors of Tamfelt Oyj until it was sold to METSO, a member of the Board of NokiaSiemensNetworks since the inception of the company, Chairman of Nebula Oy before it was sold to Telia Company, Chairman of Zervant Oy before it was sold to Ageras Group AS, a board member of Verne Global Ltd before it was sold to Digital 9 Infrastructure, Chairman of Cint Group AB up until its IPO on Nasdaq Stockholm and Chairman of SilverFin BV before it was sold to Visma Group. He also held Board positions in Klarna Bank and Doro. Currently Savander is Chairman of EasyPark Group AS, Evondos Group Oy, Outpost24 AB and Papirfly Group AS. Savander is active in the non-profit domain as well with several board memberships in Finnish foundations and he is the chairman of Waldemar von Frenckells Stiftelse.

Savander is married and has two children. He enjoys playing golf and telemark skiing

== Education ==
Savander holds a Master's degree in Science from the Helsinki University of Technology and a Master of Business Administration from Hanken School of Economics in Helsinki. He is fluent in Swedish, English, German and Finnish.
