= COVID-19 proxalutamide trial in Brazil =

Medical misconduct case

The COVID-19 proxalutamide trial in Brazil was a clinical trial that took place in Brazil and was led by Brazilian endocrinologist Flávio Cadegianil, intended to provide treatments for COVID-19 during the COVID-19 pandemic.

The clinical trials featured medical and scientific misconduct related to use of the drug proxalutamide. There were investigations from Brazilian government agencies, along with criminal and civil cases due to the deaths and injuries caused by the unethical experimentation. The case is regarded as one of the most consequential medical misconduct cases in Brazilian history.

== Background ==
In the beginning of the pandemic, it was believed that men were generally more prone to the illness than women and as a result of that, some researchers explored human male hormone blockers, also known as antiandrogens, as a treatment. The trial led by Cadegiani looked at the experimental prostate cancer and antiandrogen proxalutamide, and people from the Brazilian region of Amazon were recruited as patients in the study, given the surge in COVID-19 cases in that region in the early months of the COVID-19 pandemic in Brazil which would, according to the study's author, favor the accuracy of the research.

Brazilian president Jair Bolsonaro backed the unproven use of proxalutamide drug to treat COVID-19 as well as he previously did with ivermectin and hydroxychloroquine, both of which are also unproven treatments for the virus.

== Method ==
A total of 645 patients with COVID-19 were administered proxalutamide at nine hospitals in the Brazilian Amazon region. When they were first admitted to hospital, none required mechanical ventilation at the start of the study. The care consisted of medicines such as enoxaparin, colchicine, methylprednisolone, dexamethasone, or antibiotic therapy as necessary and some of them were given unproven COVID-19 treatments drugs such as ivermectin. Altogether, 317 patients received proxalutamide and 328 a placebo. Brazilian National Health Council (CNS) later reported such treatment was prescribed by doctors in a private hospital network as if it were an established medical treatment, despite it was approved only for clinical trial studies. The number of people who were given the drug was also larger than the number approved for the trial.

The trial, which was not peer-reviewed, reported that the 14 day recovery rate of patients was 81.4% with proxalutamide and 35.7% with placebo. Jesem Orellana, an epidemiologist who closely watched the effects of the gamma variant of COVID-19 on the Amazon region at Brazil's leading public health institute Fiocruz, said "the reported results would be a miracle — if they were true" adding that "everything about this trial is suspicious and is anything but clinical and randomised".

== Aftermath ==
Brazil's National Ethics Commission on Research (CONEP) found that 200 people died after undergoing the study and at least 40 deaths were hidden in the study's conclusions. The consent form handed to the study's patients omitted the risk of birth defects and other potential injuries from the procedures, according to the commission. It was later reported that the patients, some of which were hospitalised in intensive care units at the time, trusted the doctors participating in the study because they were desperate for a COVID-19 treatment or cure for their relatives or themselves, as the entire local healthcare system was under severe strain due to a major surge in COVID-19 cases.

After the study's preprint was published in June 2021, several scientists warned it was deeply flawed and a Brazilian research ethics commission opened an investigation into it. Science Magazine also reported that Applied Biology, a Californian hair loss company, where Cadegiani is a clinical director, teamed up with Kintor Pharmaceuticals, proxalutamide's manufacturer based in China. Additionally, UNESCO office for Latin America and Caribbean found the way the study was conducted is "alarming" and that several gross ethics violations were committed. It said the study could be one of the gravest ethical scientific misconduct in the region's history and urged an investigation into the case.

On September 2, 2021, Brazil's health regulator Anvisa suspended the prescription, usage and importation of proxalutamide in the country, and opened a separate probe about the study. On September 3, 2021, a criminal complaint was filed before Brazil's Public Prosecutor office in order to investigate the actions taken during the study as well as the consequences of it, including the patients deaths.

On June 27, 2022, academic journal Frontiers in Medicine retracted the mentioned study it had initially published in July 2021. Similarly, the BMJ Case Reports journal issued another article based on the same study and authored by Cadegiani an expression of concern, and later issued a retraction. On August 25, 2022, Brazilian Federal Police carried out several search and seizure warrants against public officials, doctors and researchers who led proxalutamide trials in the Brazilian southern state of Rio Grande do Sul and elsewhere in the country. Although no names of the suspects targeted by the operation were revealed, Cadegiani said on his social media that his house and clinic were raided by the police.

In August 2022 Brazilian federal prosecutors charged two researchers who ran the medical trial in two separate civil lawsuits as well as three hospital officials who reportedly aided them. The defendants can be fined in at least R$10 million (about US$1,917,582) in both suits if convicted.

== See also ==
- Scientific misconduct
- Patient abuse
- Unethical human experimentation
- COVID-19 pandemic in Brazil
