= Archivum Rhenanum =

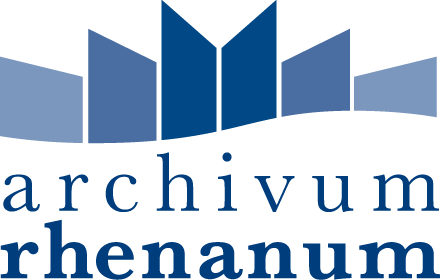
Archivum Rhenanum logo

The project Archivum Rhenanum - Archives numérisées du Rhin supérieur or "Réseau transfrontalier de sources historiques numérisées : les archives comme mémoire de l’espace du Rhin supérieur et de sa formation" in French ("Digitale Archive am Oberrhein" and "Grenzüberschreitendes Netzwerk digitaler Geschichtsquellen: Archive als Gedächtnisse der historisch gewachsenen Landschaft Oberrhein" in German) aimed to create a transnational Franco-German portal and an open network of archives. It was supported by institutions, associations and experts in history and civilization. Through this portal, the general public can now access digitized resources, along with further information about them, from archives on both sides of the border.

== The project ==
The German and French archives in the Upper Rhine region, (Baden, Palatinate and Alsace) hold unique manuscripts, some of which date from the Middle Ages and are a source of information about the history of the region and its economic, social and cultural evolution. However, only a small number of people have so far been able to access these resources: the obstacles posed by the language of the documents and the training required to understand them, the scripts used in manuscripts, and especially the dispersal of these resources among different archives have made it difficult for the general public to consult them.

The project's aim in developing the portal was to erase the border between France and Germany: through its content, it is by its very nature a bilingual, cross-border portal and an open network of different archives. The goal was to virtually reproduce the historical memory of the Upper Rhine region. This approach will allow the public to access the historical knowledge and collections of the Upper Rhine region, with the help of modern bilingual explanations of historical documents, and the use of new media (digitization online access, and communication platforms such as blogs).

The project covers the Middle Ages and the beginning of the Early Modern Period (16th century). In the past, people weren't particularly aware of the border, and natural borders such as the Rhine were 'permeable'", which sources from the Middle Ages and the Reformation show clearly. It is expected that the portal will be expanded to cover more recent historical periods, up to and including the major conflicts between France and Germany in the 19th and 20th centuries: representing the border space over time and as a whole, from the height of its strength to its weaker periods would offer a meaningful and coherent perspective.

The partner institutions contributed to the project in various ways, including preparing and digitizing the historical source documents and making them available through the portal, developing a cross-border database ("Archivum Rhenanum"), which is also permanently accessible through the portal. Further initiatives include mediation with the general public about cultural heritage as "collective memory", through, for example, the development of a platform for discussion and communication with the public that is permanently maintained. Finally, steps were taken to ensure the preservation of the archival collections.

The project ran from 2013 to 2015 and is now finished.
