= SlideShare =

American website for sharing presentations

- Website type: Slide hosting service
- Available in: Multilingual (5)
- Area served: Worldwide
- Founder: Rashmi Sinha
- Industry: Internet
- Parent: Scribd
- Website: www.slideshare.net
- Registration: Mandatory with credit card
- Users: ▲70 million
- Launched: 4 October 2006; 19 years ago
- Current status: Active

SlideShare is an American hosting service, now owned by Scribd, for professional content including presentations, infographics, documents, and videos. Users can upload files privately or publicly in PowerPoint, Word, or PDF format. Content can then be viewed on the site itself, on mobile devices or embedded on other sites. SlideShare also provides users the ability to rate, comment on, and share the uploaded content. Launched on October 4, 2006, the service positioned itself to be similar to YouTube, but for presentations. The company was acquired by LinkedIn in 2012, and then by Scribd in 2020.

In 2018, it was estimated that the website gets an estimated 80 million unique visitors a month.

== History ==
SlideShare was officially launched on October 4, 2006. Rashmi Sinha, the CEO and co-founder of SlideShare, was named among the world's Top 10 Women Influencers in Web 2.0 by Fast Company. Jonathan Boutelle was the CTO of SlideShare and came up with the initial idea behind the website and also wrote the first version of the site.

The website was originally meant to be used for businesses to share slides, but it expanded to become a host of many slides that are uploaded merely to entertain.

On May 3, 2012, SlideShare announced it was to be acquired by LinkedIn for $118.8 million.

On August 11, 2020, Scribd, Inc. acquired SlideShare from LinkedIn for an undisclosed amount. Scribd took over operations on September 24, 2020.

=== Slidecast ===
On July 24, 2007, SlideShare introduced a format called "SlideCast" to "make web multimedia using only a ppt file and an mp3". According to Boutelle, the word "slidecast" is a portmanteau of "Slide show" and "podcasting".

Slidecasts allowed users with uploaded PowerPoint, Keynote or PDF presentations to synchronize them to mp3 audio. The audio synchronization process could be started using the editor's "Edit slidecast" link.

On January 31, 2014, less than a year after its acquisition by LinkedIn Corporation, SlideShare announced that Slidecast would be shut down on April 30, 2014.

== Zipcasts ==
In February 2011 SlideShare added a feature called Zipcast. Using HTML5 Zipcast was a social web conferencing system that allowed presenters to broadcast an audio/video feed while driving the presentation through the Internet. Zipcasts also allowed users to communicate during the presentation via an inbuilt chat function.

== See also ==
- Slidecasting
