= Radiosurgery =

Surgical using radiation

- Specialty: Oncology / neurosurgery
- MedlinePlus: 007577
- eMedicine: 1423298

Radiosurgery is surgery using radiation, that is, the destruction of precisely selected areas of tissue using ionizing radiation rather than excision with a blade. Like other forms of radiation therapy (also called radiotherapy), it is usually used to treat cancer. Radiosurgery was originally defined by the Swedish neurosurgeon Lars Leksell as "a single high dose fraction of radiation, stereotactically directed to an intracranial region of interest".

In stereotactic radiosurgery (SRS), the word "stereotactic" refers to a three-dimensional coordinate system that enables accurate correlation of a virtual target seen in the patient's diagnostic images with the actual target position in the patient. Stereotactic radiosurgery may also be called stereotactic body radiation therapy (SBRT) or stereotactic ablative radiotherapy (SABR) when used outside the central nervous system (CNS).

== History ==
Stereotactic radiosurgery was first developed in 1949 by the Swedish neurosurgeon Lars Leksell to treat small targets in the brain that were not amenable to conventional surgery. The initial stereotactic instrument he conceived used probes and electrodes. The first attempt to supplant the electrodes with radiation was made in the early fifties, with x-rays. The principle of this instrument was to hit the intra-cranial target with narrow beams of radiation from multiple directions. The beam paths converge in the target volume, delivering a lethal cumulative dose of radiation there, while limiting the dose to the adjacent healthy tissue. Ten years later significant progress had been made, due in considerable measure to the contribution of the physicists Kurt Liden and Börje Larsson. At this time, stereotactic proton beams had replaced the x-rays. The heavy particle beam presented as an excellent replacement for the surgical knife, but the synchrocyclotron was too clumsy. Leksell proceeded to develop a practical, compact, precise and simple tool which could be handled by the surgeon himself. In 1968 this resulted in the Gamma Knife, which was installed at the Karolinska Institute and consisted of several cobalt-60 radioactive sources placed in a kind of helmet with central channels for irradiation with gamma rays. This prototype was designed to produce slit-like radiation lesions for functional neurosurgical procedures to treat pain, movement disorders, or behavioral disorders that did not respond to conventional treatment. The success of this first unit led to the construction of a second device, containing 179 cobalt-60 sources. This second Gamma Knife unit was designed to produce spherical lesions to treat brain tumors and intracranial arteriovenous malformations (AVMs). Additional units were installed in the 1980s all with 201 cobalt-60 sources.

In parallel to these developments, a similar approach was designed for a linear particle accelerator or Linac. Installation of the first 4 MeV clinical linear accelerator began in June 1952 in the Medical Research Council (MRC) Radiotherapeutic Research Unit at the Hammersmith Hospital, London. The system was handed over for physics and other testing in February 1953 and began to treat patients on 7 September that year. Meanwhile, work at the Stanford Microwave Laboratory led to the development of a 6 MeV accelerator, which was installed at Stanford University Hospital, California, in 1956. Linac units quickly became favored devices for conventional fractionated radiotherapy but it lasted until the 1980s before dedicated Linac radiosurgery became a reality. In 1982, the Spanish neurosurgeon J. Barcia-Salorio began to evaluate the role of cobalt-generated and then Linac-based photon radiosurgery for the treatment of AVMs and epilepsy. In 1984, Betti and Derechinsky described a Linac-based radiosurgical system. Winston and Lutz further advanced Linac-based radiosurgical prototype technologies by incorporating an improved stereotactic positioning device and a method to measure the accuracy of various components. Using a modified Linac, the first patient in the United States was treated in Boston Brigham and Women's Hospital in February 1986.

=== 21st century ===
Technological improvements in medical imaging and computing have led to increased clinical adoption of stereotactic radiosurgery and have broadened its scope in the 21st century. The localization accuracy and precision that are implicit in the word "stereotactic" remain of utmost importance for radiosurgical interventions and are significantly improved via image-guidance technologies such as the N-localizer and Sturm-Pastyr localizer that were originally developed for stereotactic surgery.

In the 21st century the original concept of radiosurgery expanded to include treatments comprising up to five fractions, and stereotactic radiosurgery has been redefined as a distinct neurosurgical discipline that utilizes externally generated ionizing radiation to inactivate or eradicate defined targets, typically in the head or spine, without the need for a surgical incision. Irrespective of the similarities between the concepts of stereotactic radiosurgery and fractionated radiotherapy the mechanism to achieve treatment is subtly different, although both treatment modalities are reported to have identical outcomes for certain indications. Stereotactic radiosurgery has a greater emphasis on delivering precise, high doses to small areas, to destroy target tissue while preserving adjacent normal tissue. The same principle is followed in conventional radiotherapy although lower dose rates spread over larger areas are more likely to be used (for example as in VMAT treatments). Fractionated radiotherapy relies more heavily on the different radiosensitivity of the target and the surrounding normal tissue to the total accumulated radiation dose. Historically, the field of fractionated radiotherapy evolved from the original concept of stereotactic radiosurgery following discovery of the principles of radiobiology: repair, reassortment, repopulation, and reoxygenation. Today, both treatment techniques are complementary, as tumors that may be resistant to fractionated radiotherapy may respond well to radiosurgery, and tumors that are too large or too close to critical organs for safe radiosurgery may be suitable candidates for fractionated radiotherapy.

Lately, both Gamma Knife and Linac radiosurgery programs are commercially available worldwide. While the Gamma Knife is dedicated to radiosurgery, many Linacs are built for conventional fractionated radiotherapy and require additional technology and expertise to become dedicated radiosurgery tools. There is not a clear difference in efficacy between these different approaches. The major manufacturers, Varian and Elekta offer dedicated radiosurgery Linacs as well as machines designed for conventional treatment with radiosurgery capabilities. Systems designed to complement conventional Linacs with beam-shaping technology, treatment planning, and image-guidance tools to provide. An example of a dedicated radiosurgery Linac is the CyberKnife, a compact Linac mounted onto a robotic arm that moves around the patient and irradiates the tumor from a large set of fixed positions, thereby mimicking the Gamma Knife concept.

== Mechanism of action ==
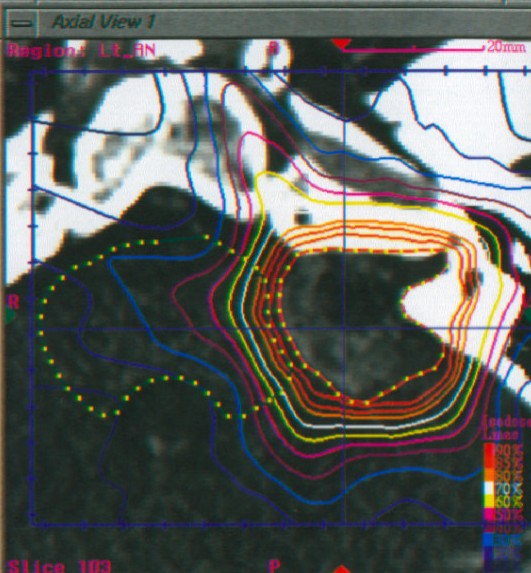
Planning CT scan with IV contrast in a patient with left cerebellopontine angle vestibular schwannoma

The fundamental principle of radiosurgery is that of selective ionization of tissue, by means of high-energy beams of radiation. Ionization is the production of ions and free radicals which are damaging to the cells. These ions and radicals, which may be formed from the water in the cell or biological materials, can produce irreparable damage to DNA, proteins, and lipids, resulting in the cell's death. Thus, biological inactivation is carried out in a volume of tissue to be treated, with a precise destructive effect. The radiation dose is usually measured in grays (one gray (Gy) is the absorption of one joule of energy per kilogram of mass). A unit that attempts to take into account both the different organs that are irradiated and the type of radiation is the sievert, a unit that describes both the amount of energy deposited and the biological effectiveness.

== Clinical applications ==
When used outside the CNS it may be called stereotactic body radiation therapy (SBRT) or stereotactic ablative radiotherapy (SABR).

=== Brain and spine ===
Radiosurgery is performed by a multidisciplinary team of neurosurgeons, radiation oncologists and medical physicists to operate and maintain highly sophisticated, highly precise and complex instruments, including medical linear accelerators, the Gamma Knife unit and the Cyberknife unit. The highly precise irradiation of targets within the brain and spine is planned using information from medical images that are obtained via computed tomography, magnetic resonance imaging, and angiography.

Radiosurgery is indicated primarily for the therapy of tumors, vascular lesions and functional disorders. Significant clinical judgment must be used with this technique and considerations must include lesion type, pathology if available, size, location and age and general health of the patient. General contraindications to radiosurgery include excessively large size of the target lesion, or lesions too numerous for practical treatment. Patients can be treated within one to five days as outpatients. By comparison, the average hospital stay for a craniotomy (conventional neurosurgery, requiring the opening of the skull) is about 15 days. The radiosurgery outcome may not be evident until months after the treatment. Since radiosurgery does not remove the tumor but inactivates it biologically, lack of growth of the lesion is normally considered to be treatment success. General indications for radiosurgery include many kinds of brain tumors, such as acoustic neuromas, germinomas, meningiomas, metastases, trigeminal neuralgia, arteriovenous malformations, and skull base tumors, among others.

Stereotatic radiosurgery of the spinal metastasis is efficient in controlling pain in up to 90% of the cases and ensures stability of the tumours on imaging evaluation in 95% of the cases, and is more efficient for spinal metastasis involving one or two segments. Meanwhile, conventional external beam radiotherapy is more suitable for multiple spinal involvement.

=== Combination therapy ===
SRS may be administered alone or in combination with other therapies. For brain metastases, these treatment options include whole brain radiation therapy (WBRT), surgery, and systemic therapies. However, a recent systematic review found no difference in the affects on overall survival or deaths due to brain metastases when comparing SRS treatment alone to SRS plus WBRT treatment or WBRT alone.

=== Other bodily organs ===
Expansion of stereotactic radiotherapy to other lesions is increasing, and includes liver cancer, lung cancer, pancreatic cancer, etc.

== Risks ==
The New York Times reported in December 2010 that radiation overdoses had occurred with the linear accelerator method of radiosurgery, due in large part to inadequate safeguards in equipment retrofitted for stereotactic radiosurgery. In the U.S. the Food and Drug Administration (FDA) regulates these devices, whereas the Gamma Knife is regulated by the Nuclear Regulatory Commission.

This is evidence that immunotherapy may be useful for treatment of radiation necrosis following stereotactic radiotherapy.

== Types of radiation source ==
The selection of the proper kind of radiation and device depends on many factors including lesion type, size, and location in relation to critical structures. Data suggest that similar clinical outcomes are possible with all of the various techniques. More important than the device used are issues regarding indications for treatment, total dose delivered, fractionation schedule and conformity of the treatment plan.

=== Gamma Knife ===
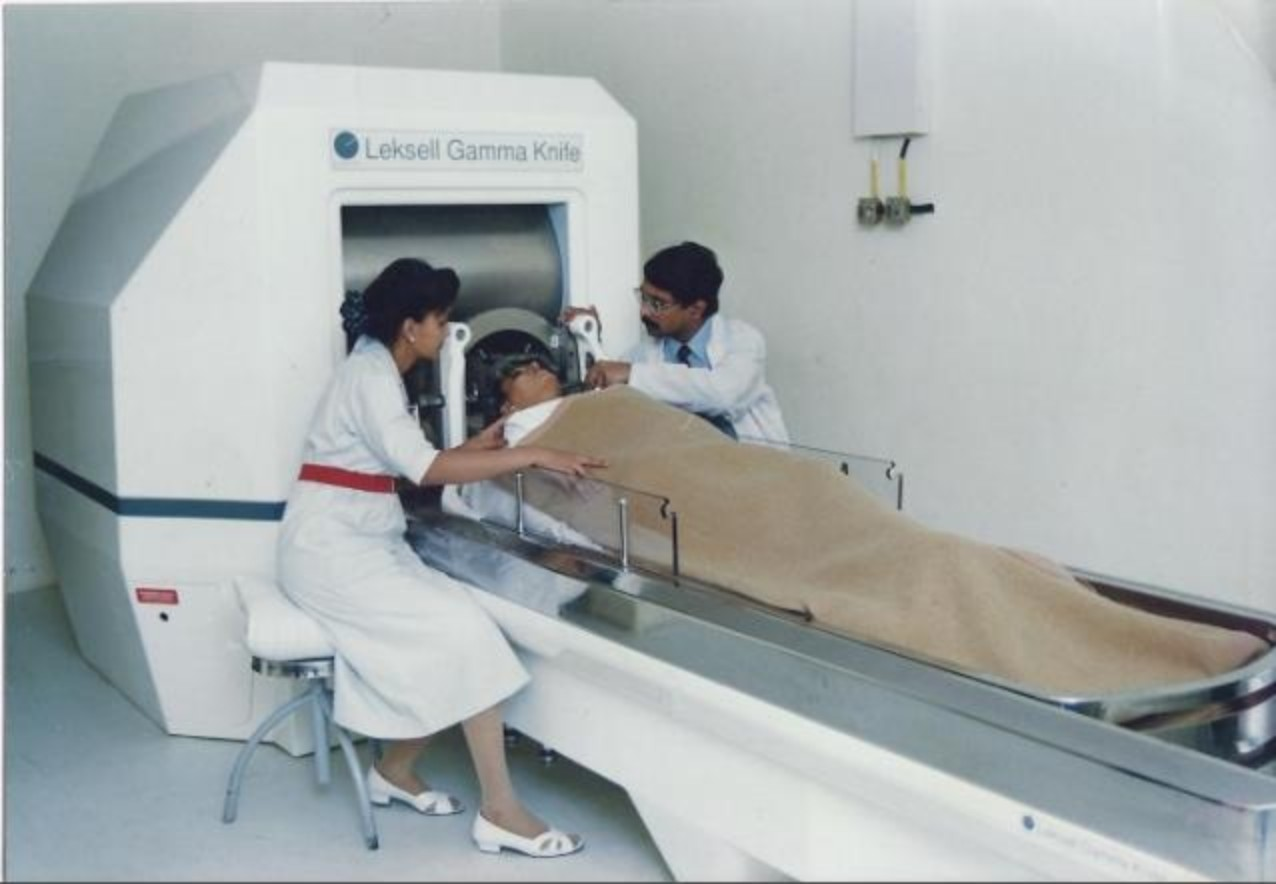
A doctor performing Gamma Knife Radiosurgery

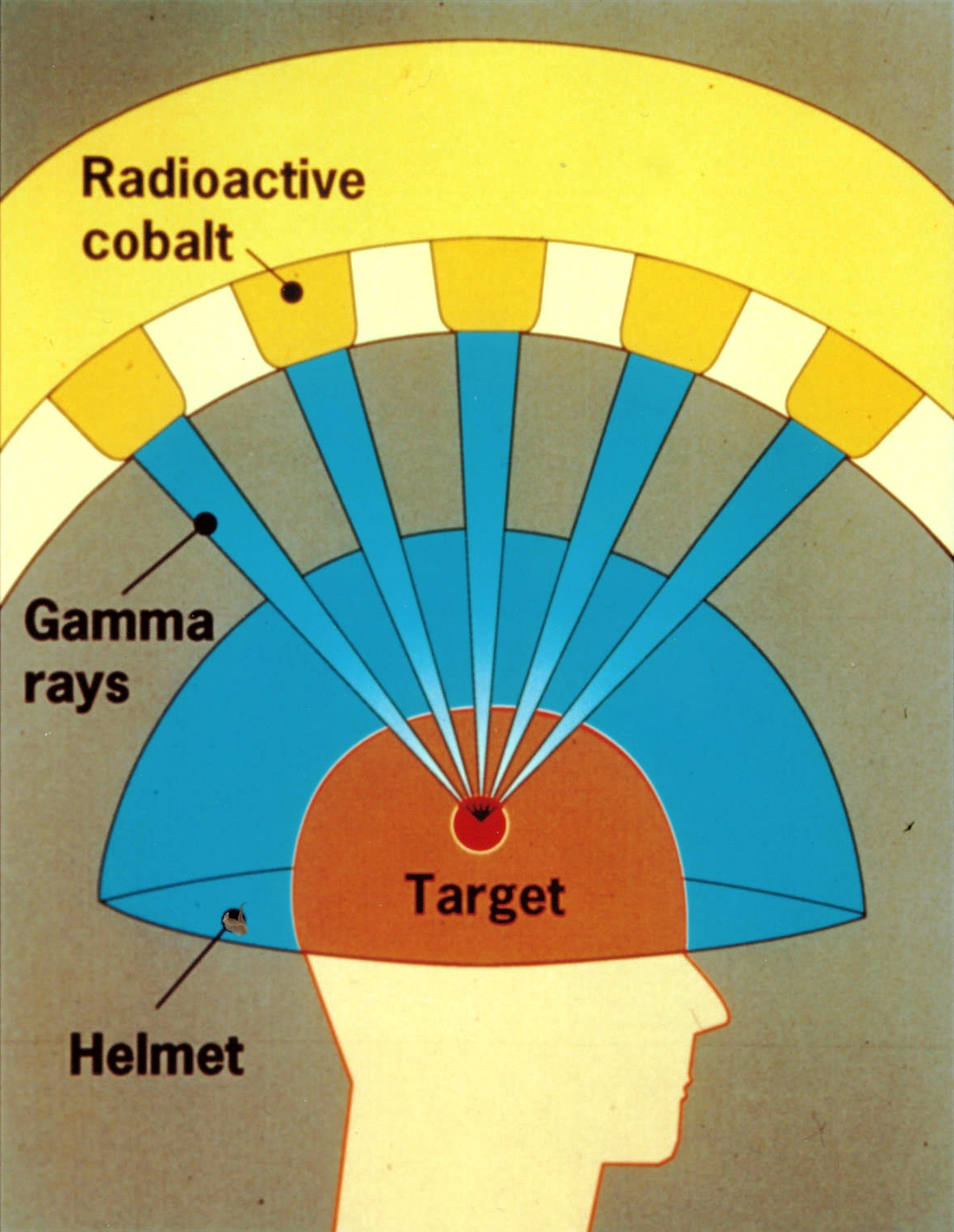
NRC graphic of the Leksell Gamma Knife

A Gamma Knife (also known as the Leksell Gamma Knife) is used to treat brain tumors by administering high-intensity gamma radiation therapy in a manner that concentrates the radiation over a small volume. The device was invented in 1967 at the Karolinska Institute in Stockholm, Sweden, by Lars Leksell, Romanian-born neurosurgeon Ladislau Steiner, and radiobiologist Börje Larsson from Uppsala University, Sweden.

A Gamma Knife typically contains 201 cobalt-60 sources of approximately 30 curies each (1.1 TBq), placed in a hemispheric array in a heavily shielded assembly. The device aims gamma radiation through a target point in the patient's brain. The patient wears a specialized helmet that is surgically fixed to the skull, so that the brain tumor remains stationary at the target point of the gamma rays. An ablative dose of radiation is thereby sent through the tumor in one treatment session, while surrounding brain tissues are relatively spared.

Gamma Knife therapy, like all radiosurgery, uses doses of radiation to kill cancer cells and shrink tumors, delivered precisely to avoid damaging healthy brain tissue. Gamma Knife radiosurgery is able to accurately focus many beams of gamma radiation on one or more tumors. Each individual beam is of relatively low intensity, so the radiation has little effect on intervening brain tissue and is concentrated only at the tumor itself.

Gamma Knife radiosurgery has proven effective for patients with benign or malignant brain tumors up to 4 cm (1.6 in) in size, vascular malformations such as an arteriovenous malformation (AVM), pain, and other functional problems. For treatment of trigeminal neuralgia the procedure may be used repeatedly on patients.

Acute complications following Gamma Knife radiosurgery are rare, and complications are related to the condition being treated.

=== Linear accelerator-based therapies ===
A linear accelerator (linac) produces x-rays from the impact of accelerated electrons striking a high z target, usually tungsten. The process is also referred to as "x-ray therapy" or "photon therapy." The emission head, or "gantry", is mechanically rotated around the patient in a full or partial circle. The table where the patient is lying, the "couch", can also be moved in small linear or angular steps. The combination of the movements of the gantry and of the couch allow the computerized planning of the volume of tissue that is going to be irradiated. Devices with a high energy of 6 MeV are commonly used for the treatment of the brain, due to the depth of the target. The diameter of the energy beam leaving the emission head can be adjusted to the size of the lesion by means of collimators. They may be interchangeable orifices with different diameters, typically varying from 5 to 40 mm in 5 mm steps, or multileaf collimators, which consist of a number of metal leaflets that can be moved dynamically during treatment in order to shape the radiation beam to conform to the mass to be ablated. As of 2017 Linacs were capable of achieving extremely narrow beam geometries, such as 0.15 to 0.3 mm. Therefore, they can be used for several kinds of surgeries which hitherto had been carried out by open or endoscopic surgery, such as for trigeminal neuralgia. Long-term follow-up data has shown it to be as effective as radiofrequency ablation, but inferior to surgery in preventing the recurrence of pain.

The first such systems were developed by John R. Adler, a Stanford University professor of neurosurgery and radiation oncology, and Russell and Peter Schonberg at Schonberg Research, and commercialized under the brand name CyberKnife.

=== Proton beam therapy ===
Protons may also be used in radiosurgery in a procedure called Proton Beam Therapy (PBT) or proton therapy. Protons are extracted from proton donor materials by a medical synchrotron or cyclotron, and accelerated in successive transits through a circular, evacuated conduit or cavity, using powerful magnets to shape their path, until they reach the energy required to just traverse a human body, usually about 200 MeV. They are then released toward the region to be treated in the patient's body, the irradiation target. In some machines, which deliver protons of only a specific energy, a custom mask made of plastic is interposed between the beam source and the patient to adjust the beam energy to provide the appropriate degree of penetration. The phenomenon of the Bragg peak of ejected protons gives proton therapy advantages over other forms of radiation, since most of the proton's energy is deposited within a limited distance, so tissue beyond this range (and to some extent also tissue inside this range) is spared from the effects of radiation. This property of protons, which has been called the "depth charge effect" by analogy to the explosive weapons used in anti-submarine warfare, allows for conformal dose distributions to be created around even very irregularly shaped targets, and for higher doses to targets surrounded or backstopped by radiation-sensitive structures such as the optic chiasm or brainstem. The development of "intensity modulated" techniques allowed similar conformities to be attained using linear accelerator radiosurgery.

As of 2013 there was no evidence that proton beam therapy is better than any other types of treatment in most cases, except for a "handful of rare pediatric cancers". Critics, responding to the increasing number of very expensive PBT installations, spoke of a "medical arms race" and "crazy medicine and unsustainable public policy".
