= Cyberknife (device) =

Radiation therapy device

The CyberKnife system is a radiation therapy device manufactured by Accuray. The system is used to deliver radiosurgery for the treatment of benign tumors, malignant tumors and other medical conditions.

== Device ==
The device consists of a small linear accelerator attached to a robotic arm, along with an integrated image guidance system. During treatment, the image guidance system captures 3D images, tracks the movement of tumors, and guides the robotic arm to accurately aim the treatment beam at the moving tumor.

The system is designed for stereotactic radiosurgery (SRS) and stereotactic body radiation therapy (SBRT). The system is also used for select 3D conformal radiotherapy (3D-CRT) and intensity modulated radiation therapy (IMRT).

== History ==
The development of the system began in 1989 with contributions from John R. Adler, a surgeon at Stanford University, and Peter and Russell Schonberg of Schonberg Radiation Corporation. This work expanded upon earlier efforts in the 1980s to adapt standard linear accelerators for radiosurgery. The inaugural CyberKnife system was installed at Stanford University in 1991, receiving clearance for clinical investigation by the U.S. Food and Drug Administration (FDA) in 1994. Following extensive clinical research, the FDA granted approval for the treatment of intracranial tumors in 1999 and for tumors throughout the body in 2001. Subsequently, Accuray has introduced seven CyberKnife System models, including the CyberKnife G3 System (2005), CyberKnife G4 System (2007), CyberKnife VSI System (2009), CyberKnife M6 System (2012), and CyberKnife S7 System (2020).

== Clinical application ==
The system is used to treat tumors of the pancreas, liver, prostate, spine, cancer of the throat and brain, and benign tumors.

== See also ==
- Image-guided radiation therapy
- Horsley–Clarke apparatus
- Gamma knife
- Robotic surgery
