= Trip Adler =

American entrepreneur

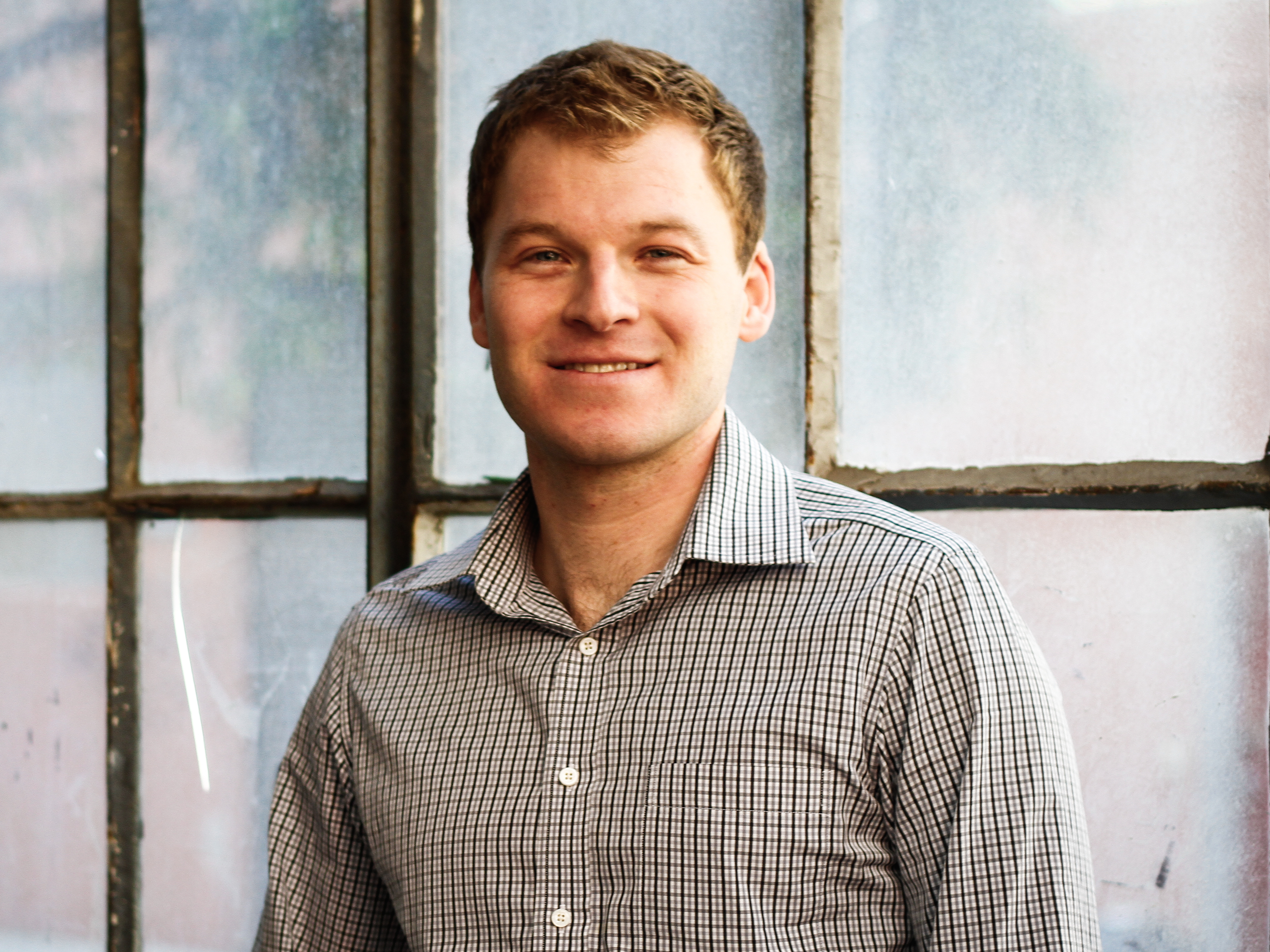
- Education: Harvard University
- Occupations: former CEO and Co-founder of Scribd
- Known for: Founding Scribd
- Website: www.scribd.com

John R. "Trip" Adler III is an American tech executive who has been the chief executive officer (CEO) of Created by Humans since 2024. He co-founded Scribd in 2007, and was the CEO until 2023.

== Early life and education ==
Adler grew up in Palo Alto, California and attended Gunn High School. He graduated from Harvard University with a biophysics degree. His father, John R. Adler, is a neurosurgeon at Stanford University and also an entrepreneur.

== Career ==
After graduating from Harvard, Adler contemplated starting various online ventures, including a ride-sharing service, a Craigslist-type site for colleges called Hulist, a call center called 1-800-ASKTRIP, and a social media site called "Rate your happiness."

Adler received inspiration for Scribd from a conversation with his father, who had difficulty publishing an academic paper in a medical journal. Adler then built Scribd with Jared Friedman, a fellow Harvard student, and they attended Y Combinator in the summer of 2006. Scribd was launched from a San Francisco apartment in March 2007.

In 2024, Adler co-founded Created by Humans.

== Personal life ==
As a member of the Harvard Surfing team, Adler participated in the first Ivy League Surf Championships in May 2003. He also plays the saxophone. In 2007, Adler earned the company's first $17 in revenue by playing the saxophone outside Scribd's office at Christmas time.

== Awards and recognition ==
- Named to TIME’s list of tech pioneers of 2010
- Named to Bloomberg Businessweek’s list of best young entrepreneurs
- Forbes 30 Under 30
