= Scribd =

E-book subscription service and document publishing platform

Scribd, Inc.
- Scribd Inc. company logo
- Company type: Private
- Available in: English, French, German, Indonesian, Italian, Portuguese, Romanian, Russian, Spanish
- Founded: March 2007; 19 years ago
- Headquarters: San Francisco, California, U.S.
- Founders: Trip Adler; Jared Friedman; Tikhon Bernstam
- CEO: Tony Grimminck
- Products: Scribd; SlideShare; Everand; Fable
- Services: Social reading and publishing platform
- Website: www.scribdinc.com

Scribd Inc. (pronounced /ˈskrɪbd/) is an American media company that operates four primary platforms: Scribd, Everand, SlideShare, and Fable. Scribd is a digital document library that hosts over 240 million documents. Everand is a digital content subscription service offering a selection of ebooks, audiobooks, magazines, podcasts, and sheet music. SlideShare is an online platform featuring 25 million presentations uploaded by subject matter experts.

The company was founded in 2007 by Trip Adler, Jared Friedman and Tikhon Bernstam, and is headquartered in San Francisco, California. Tony Grimminck took over as CEO in 2024.

== History ==
Previous logo

=== Founding (2007–2013) ===
Scribd began as a site to host and share documents. While at Harvard, Trip Adler was inspired to start Scribd after learning about the lengthy process required to publish academic papers. His father, a doctor at Stanford, was told it would take 18 months to have his medical research published. Adler wanted to create a simple way to publish and share written content online. He co-founded Scribd with Jared Friedman and attended the inaugural class of Y Combinator in the summer of 2006. There, Scribd received its initial $120,000 in seed funding and then launched in a San Francisco apartment in March 2007.

Scribd was called "the YouTube for documents", allowing anyone to self-publish on the site using its document reader. The document reader turns PDFs, Word documents, and PowerPoints into Web documents that can be shared on any website that allows embeds. In its first year, Scribd grew to 23.5 million visitors as of November 2008. It also ranked as one of the top 20 social media sites according to Comscore.

In June 2009, Scribd launched the Scribd Store, where writers can upload and sell digital copies of their work online. That same month, the site partnered with Simon & Schuster to sell e-books on Scribd. The deal made digital editions of 5,000 titles available for purchase on Scribd, including books from the bestselling authors Stephen King, Dan Brown, and Mary Higgins Clark.

In October 2009, Scribd launched its branded reader for media companies including The New York Times, Los Angeles Times, Chicago Tribune, The Huffington Post, TechCrunch, and MediaBistro. ProQuest began publishing dissertations and theses on Scribd in December 2009. In August 2010, some notable documents hosted on Scribd became viral phenomenons, including the California Proposition 8 ruling, which received over 100,000 views in about 24 minutes, and HP's lawsuit against Mark Hurd's move to Oracle.

=== Subscription service (2013–2023) ===
In October 2013, Scribd officially launched its subscription service for e-books. This gave users unlimited access to Scribd's library of digital books for a flat monthly fee. The company also announced a partnership with HarperCollins which made the backlist of HarperCollins' catalog available on the subscription service. According to Chantal Restivo-Alessi, chief digital officer at HarperCollins, this marked the first time that the publisher had released such a large portion of its catalog. In March 2014, Scribd announced a deal with Lonely Planet, offering the travel publisher's entire library on its subscription service.

In May 2014, Scribd added 10,000 titles from Simon & Schuster to its subscription offering. These titles included works from Ray Bradbury, Doris Kearns Goodwin, Ernest Hemingway, Walter Isaacson, Stephen King, Chuck Klosterman, and David McCullough. Scribd has been criticized for advertising a free 14 day trial for which payment is required before readers can trial the products. Readers discover this when they attempt to download material.

Scribd added audiobooks to its subscription service in November 2014 and comic books in February 2015.

In February 2016, it was announced that only titles from a rotating selection of the library would be available for unlimited reading, and subscribers would have credits to read three books and one audiobook per month from the broader library with unused credits rolling over to the next month.

The reporting system was discontinued on February 6, 2018, in favor of a system of "constantly rotating catalogs of ebooks and audiobooks" that provided "an unlimited number of books and audiobooks, alongside unlimited access to news, magazines, documents, and sheet music" for a monthly subscription fee. However, under this service, Scribd would occasionally "limit the titles that you're able to access within a specific content library in a 30-day period".

=== Audiobooks ===
In November 2014, Scribd added audiobooks to its subscription library. Wired said that this was the first subscription service to offer unlimited access to audiobooks, and that "it represents a much larger shift in the way digital content is consumed over the net". In April 2015, the company expanded its audiobook catalog in a deal with Penguin Random House. This added 9,000 audiobooks to its platform, including titles from Lena Dunham, John Grisham, Gillian Flynn, and George R.R. Martin.

=== Comics ===
In February 2015, Scribd introduced comics to its subscription service. The company added 10,000 comics and graphic novels from publishers including Marvel, Archie, Boom! Studios, Dynamite, IDW, and Valiant. These included the Guardians of the Galaxy, Daredevil, X-O Manowar, and The Avengers series. However, in December 2016, comics were eliminated from the service.

=== Unbundling (2023–present) ===
In November 2023, the Scribd product offering was unbundled from one single product into three distinct ones: Everand, Scribd, and Slideshare. Everand was launched as a new subscription-based service, focused on entertainment in the form of books, magazines, podcasts, sheet music, and some other offerings.

=== Social reading app for book club communities (2025) ===
In 2025, Scribd acquired Fable, and all Fable employees became Scribd employees. Fable is a platform for online book clubs ("social reading" communities) launched in 2021 by Padmasree Warrior. At the time of the acquisition, Fable hosted more than 100,000 book clubs on its app.

== Timeline ==
In February 2010, Scribd announced its first mobile plans for e-readers and smartphones. In April 2010 Scribd launched a new feature called "Readcast", which allows automatic sharing of documents on Facebook and Twitter. Also in April 2010, Scribd announced its integration of Facebook social plug-ins at the Facebook f8 Developer Conference.

Scribd rolled out a redesign on September 13, 2010, to try to become, according to TechCrunch, "the social network for reading".

In October 2013, Scribd launched its e-book subscription service, with readers paying a flat monthly fee in exchange for unlimited access to Scribd's book titles.

In August 2020, Scribd announced its acquisition of the LinkedIn-owned SlideShare for an undisclosed amount.

In November 2023, Scribd unbundled into three distinct products: Everand, Scribd, and Slideshare. Everand was launched as a new product, focusing on entertainment in the form of books, magazines, podcasts, sheet music, and some other offerings.

== Financials ==
The company was initially funded with US$120,000 from Y Combinator in 2006, and received over US$3.7 million in June 2007 from Redpoint Ventures and The Kinsey Hills Group.

In December 2008, the company raised US$9 million in a second round of funding led by Charles River Ventures with re-investment from Redpoint Ventures and Kinsey Hills Group.

David O. Sacks, former PayPal COO and founder of Yammer and Geni, joined Scribd's board of directors in January 2010.

In January 2011, Scribd raised $13 million in a Series C round led by MLC Investments of Australia and SVB Capital.

In January 2015, the company raised US$22 million from Khosla Ventures with partner Keith Rabois joining the Scribd board of directors.

In 2019, Scribd raised $58 million in a financing round led by Spectrum Equity.

== Technology ==
In July 2008, Scribd began using iPaper, a document format similar to PDF and built for the web, which allows users to embed documents into a web page. iPaper was built with Adobe Flash, allowing it to be viewed the same across different operating systems (Windows, Mac OS, and Linux) without conversion, as long as the reader has Flash installed (although Scribd announced non-Flash support for the iPhone). All major document types can be formatted into iPaper including Word documents, PowerPoint presentations, PDFs, OpenDocument documents, OpenOffice.org XML documents, and PostScript files.

All iPaper documents are hosted on Scribd. Scribd allows published documents to either be private or open to the larger Scribd community. The iPaper document viewer is also embeddable in a website or blog, showing documents in their original layout regardless of the original file format. Scribd iPaper required Flash cookies to be enabled, which was the default setting in Flash.

On May 5, 2010 at the Web 2.0 Conference in San Francisco, Scribd announced they would be converting the entire site to HTML5. TechCrunch reported that Scribd was migrating away from Flash to HTML5. "Scribd co-founder and chief technology officer Jared Friedman tells me: 'We are scrapping three years of Flash development and betting the company on HTML5 because we believe HTML5 is a dramatically better reading experience than Flash. Now any document can become a Web page.'"

Scribd has an API to integrate external/third-party applications, but is no longer offering new API accounts.

Since 2010, Scribd has been available on mobile phones and e-readers, in addition to personal computers. As of December 2013, Scribd became available on app stores and various mobile devices.

== Reception ==
=== Accusations of defrauding and stealing from users ===
Scribd has been accused of "[having] built its business on stealing from former customers", after numerous complaints of continuing to charge former subscribers on a monthly basis who had cancelled their subscriptions long prior to the charges.

=== Accusations of copyright infringement ===
Scribd has also been accused of copyright infringement. In 2007, one year after its inception, Scribd was served with 25 Digital Millennium Copyright Act (DMCA) takedown notices. In March 2009, The Guardian writes, "Harry Potter author [J.K. Rowling] is among writers shocked to discover their books available as free downloads. Neil Blair, Rowling's lawyer, said the Harry Potter downloads were 'unauthorised and unlawful' ... Rowling's novels aren't the only ones to be available from Scribd. A quick search throws up novels from Salman Rushdie, Ian McEwan, Jeffrey Archer, Ken Follett, Philippa Gregory, and J.R.R. Tolkien." In September 2009, American author Elaine Scott alleged that Scribd "shamelessly profits from the stolen copyrighted works of innumerable authors". Her attorneys sought class action status in their efforts to win damages from Scribd for allegedly "egregious copyright infringement" and accused it of calculated copyright infringement for profit. The suit was dropped in July 2010.

=== Controversies ===
In March 2009, the passwords of several Comcast customers were leaked on Scribd. The passwords were later removed when the news was published by The New York Times.

In July 2010, the script of The Social Network (2010) movie was uploaded and leaked on Scribd; it was later taken down per Sony's DMCA request.

Following a decision of the Istanbul 12th Criminal Court of Peace, dated March 8, 2013, access to Scribd has been blocked for Internet users in Turkey.

In July 2014, Scribd was sued by the National Federation of the Blind and a blind Vermont resident for allegedly failing to provide access to blind readers, in violation of the Americans with Disabilities Act. Scribd moved to dismiss, arguing that the ADA only applied to physical locations. In March 2015, the U.S. District Court of Vermont ruled that the ADA covered online businesses as well. A settlement agreement was reached, with Scribd agreeing to provide content accessible to blind readers by the end of 2017.

=== BookID ===
To counteract the uploading of unauthorized content, Scribd created BookID, an automated copyright protection system for identifying unauthorized use of works on Scribd. This technology works by analyzing documents for semantic data, metadata, images, and other elements to create an encoded "fingerprint" of the copyrighted work.

== Supported file formats ==
Supported formats include:

- Microsoft Excel (.xls, .xlsx)
- Microsoft PowerPoint (.ppt, .pps, .pptx, .ppsx)
- Microsoft Word (.doc, .docx)
- OpenDocument (.odt, .odp, .ods, .odf, .odg)
- OpenOffice.org XML (.sxw, .sxi, .sxc, .sxd)
- Plain text (.txt)
- Portable Document Format (.pdf)
- PostScript (.ps)
- Rich text format (.rtf)
- Tagged image file format (.tif, .tiff)

== See also ==
- Slideshare
- Everand
- Amazon Lending Library and Kindle Unlimited
- Document collaboration
- Oyster (company)
- Wayback Machine
- WebCite
