= Florman =

Florman is a surname. Notable people with the surname include:

- Ernest Florman (1863–1952), Swedish director and photographer
- Irving Florman (1892–1981), Polish-born American diplomat
- Marianne Florman (born 1964), Danish team handball player
- Mark Florman (born 1958), British businessman
- Samuel C. Florman (1925–2024), American civil engineer, contractor, and author
- Sander S. Florman, American transplant surgeon
