= Shwartzman phenomenon =

- Other names: Shwartzman reaction, Sanarelli-Shwartzman reaction
- Specialty: Hematology
- Causes: bacterial endotoxin

Shwartzman phenomenon (also known as the Shwartzman reaction and the Sanarelli-Shwartzman reaction) is a rare hyperimmune reaction of the body to toxins associated with bacteria.

== History ==
In 1923, Gregory Shwartzman, a doctor at Mount Sinai Hospital in New York City was trying to understand the Arthus reaction in terms of bacterial endotoxins and observed that after injecting a small dose of Bacillus typhosis (currently known as Salmonella enterica serovar Typhi into the skin of rabbits as a "priming dose" and then following 24 hours later with an intravenous injection of the same toxin caused a hemorrhagic necrosis at the original injection site in the skin.

Shwartzman then repeated the experiments to find that this phenomenon also occurred when using the solution obtained after filtering out the live bacteria (culture filtrate). The culture filtrate contained the toxic lipopolysaccharide endotoxins from Salmonella typhi.

Four years before Shwartzman published his paper, a controversial Italian researcher named Giuseppe Sanarelli described a similar phenomenon using culture filtrates from Vibrio cholerae.

== Description ==
In the experiment by Shwartzman, the phenomenon begins with a "priming" event. The initial injury (e.g. injection) of the skin is combined with the introduction of strong antigens (e.g. endotoxins like lipopolysaccharide in the bacterial filtrate) inititate the innate immune response. Stimulated by the toxins, macrophages release cytokines both mast and defensive white blood cells rush to the injection site to fend off bacterial invaders.

The second dose of this "two-hit" model is another injection of toxin, but this time delivered intravenously and known as the "provocative" dose. This must be timed within a narrow window between 2 and 36 hours after the priming dose. The timing is to coincide with presence of the activated white blood cells in the tissue at the site of the priming dose.

The massive neutrophil infiltration at the priming injection site releases the pro-inflammatory cytokines IL- 1, TNF, IFN-γ, and IL-15. Complement is activated and a deposition of fibrin and platelets within the lumen of the capillaries leads to coagulation and obstruction of the capillaries at the site of the priming injection. This culminates in a lack of oxygen which in turn causes necrosis of the surrounding tissue. The skin at the injection site turns blue and then purple as the necrosis progresses.

The phenomenon can be local (as in the experiment) or generalized (if both doses are given intravenously). The generalized Shwartzman reaction serves as an experimental model for disseminated intravascular coagulation (DIC).

== Associated Conditions ==
The disease conditions the Shwartzman phenomenon provides a model for understanding include:

- Hemolytic uremic syndrome (HUS)
- Meningococcemia
- Purpura fulminans
- Septic shock
- Septic abortion / Septicemia after abortion
- Thrombotic thrombocytopenic purpura (TTP)
- Waterhouse–Friderichsen syndrome
