= Mount Sinai Hospital (Manhattan) =

Hospital and academic medical center in New York City

- Mount Sinai Health System
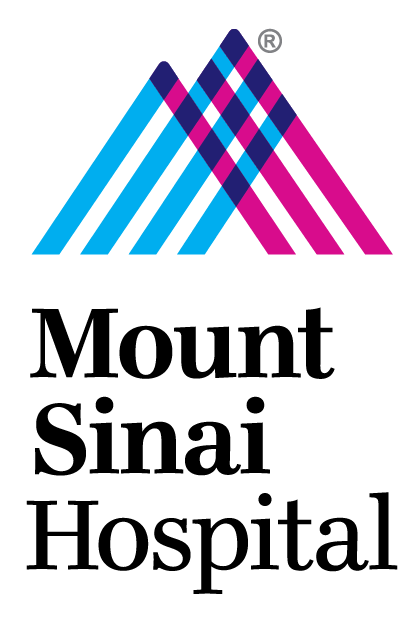

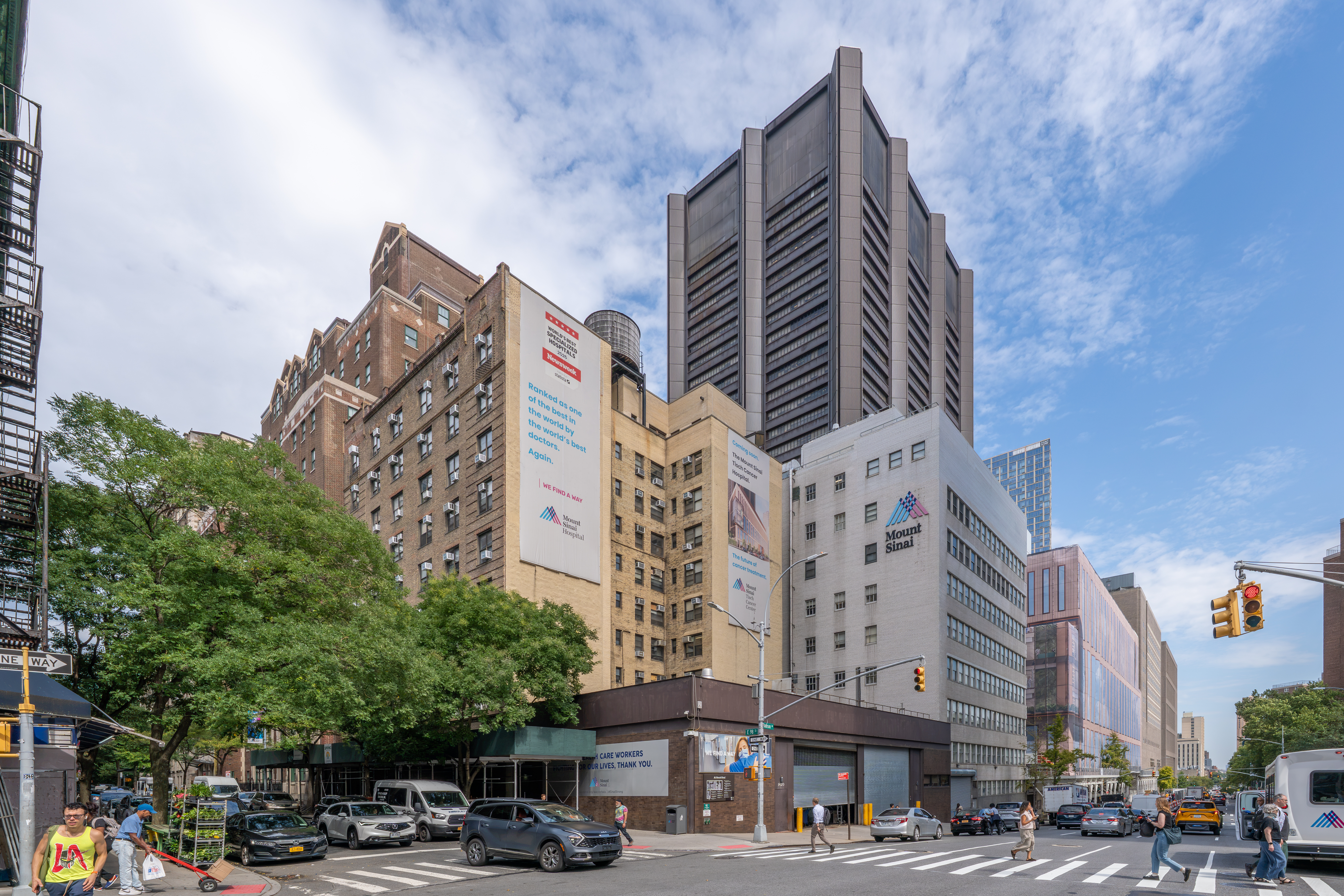
- Mount Sinai Hospital campus as seen from Madison Avenue (2026)

Geography
- Location: 1 Gustave L. Levy Place and 1468 Madison Avenue, Upper East Side, Manhattan, New York City, New York, United States
- Coordinates: 40.790066°N 73.953249°W

Organization
- Type: Teaching
- Affiliated university: Icahn School of Medicine at Mount Sinai
- Network: Mount Sinai Health System

Services
- Emergency department: Yes
- Beds: 1,139

History
- Founded: 1852

Links
- Website: mountsinai.org/locations/mount-sinai
- Lists: Hospitals in New York State
- Other links: Hospitals in Manhattan

The Mount Sinai Hospital is a nonprofit teaching hospital on Manhattan's Upper East Side in New York City that provides advanced and specialized medical care. Located beside Central Park between East 98th and 102nd streets, it is the flagship hospital of the Mount Sinai Health System and is affiliated with the Icahn School of Medicine at Mount Sinai. The hospital provides adult and pediatric care across medical and surgical specialties and is designated by New York State as a Designated AIDS Center, Sexual Assault Forensic Examiner (SAFE) hospital, Comprehensive Stroke Center, and Regional Perinatal Center.

The institution was founded in 1852 as The Jews' Hospital in the City of New York by Jewish philanthropists seeking to provide care for the city's Jewish immigrant population and professional opportunities for Jewish physicians, who faced discrimination at other medical institutions. It opened on West 28th Street in 1855, changed its name to Mount Sinai Hospital in 1866 as it became a nonsectarian institution, moved to Lexington Avenue between East 66th and 67th streets in 1872, and moved to its present Upper East Side campus in 1904. The hospital later established the Mount Sinai School of Medicine, which admitted its first students in 1968 and at which point the overall entity became known as The Mount Sinai Medical Center.

Mount Sinai is known for the large number of medical breakthroughs it has pioneered and has long been considered one of the preeminent medical institutions in the country. For instance, Abraham Jacobi is widely regarded as the father of American pediatrics, while Mount Sinai physicians and researchers have contributed to the description, and hence naming, of Crohn's disease, Tay–Sachs disease, the Shwartzman phenomenon, and the Rubin test. In February 2026, the hospital was ranked 22nd among over 2,500 hospitals in the world and the best hospital in New York state by Newsweek/Statista. Also included on the campus are the Mount Sinai Kravis Children's Hospital and clinical facilities associated with the Mount Sinai Tisch Cancer Center. The campus has seen much redevelopment over the decades; well-known structures on it include the Annenberg Building and the Guggenheim Pavilion.

== Naming ==
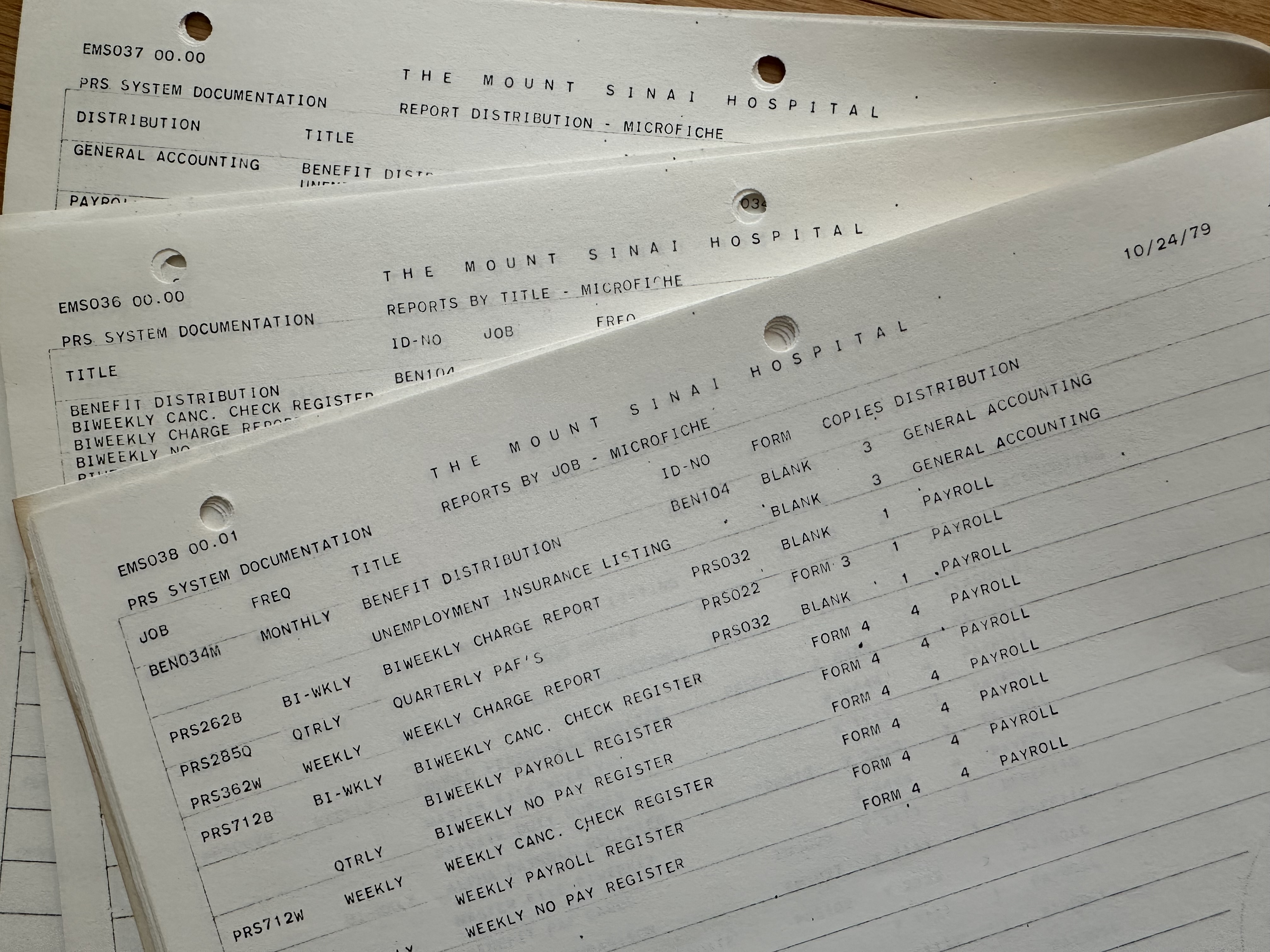
Data processing department report from 1979, showing 'The Mount Sinai Hospital' usage in the page headings, in order to distinguish it from any other Mount Sinai hospitals

There are, or have been, a number of different and unrelated healthcare institutions in North America called "Mount Sinai Hospital" – all named after the Mount Sinai of the Hebrew Bible – including one in Cleveland (opened 1903), one in Milwaukee (opened 1903), one in Philadelphia (opened 1905), one in Montréal (opened 1909), one in Chicago (opened 1912, changed to name 1919), one in Norfolk (opened 1921), one in Hartford (opened 1923), one in Toronto (opened 1923, changed to name 1924), one in Los Angeles (opened 1923, changed to exact name in 1926), one in Miami Beach (opened 1946), and one in Detroit (opened in 1953). But the one in New York was first.

Accordingly, the hospital and its associated entities have long considered usage around the name "Mount Sinai" to be important. Part of this is that in Mount Sinai publications and use, the flagship hospital's name is always preceded by a capitalized 'The', thus 'The Mount Sinai Hospital', even in running text, while the other hospitals in the health system, such as Mount Sinai Morningside and Mount Sinai West, get no 'the' or 'The' at all.

== History ==
=== 19th century ===
==== Creation of The Jews' Hospital ====
At the time of the founding of the hospital in 1852, other hospitals in New York City discriminated against Jewish people by not hiring Jewish doctors or nurses and by prohibiting Jewish patients from being treated in the hospitals' wards. Jewish doctors themselves faced restrictive quotas or outright refusal when it came to medical education and training in specialties. Orthodox Jewish philanthropist Sampson Simson worked with eight other Jewish benefactors to found the hospital in order to address the needs of New York's rapidly growing Jewish immigrant community, needs which included communicating with immigrants in the German language, the availability of kosher foods, and the understanding of Jewish burial customs.

Originally called The Jews' Hospital in the City of New York, it was the second Jewish hospital in the United States, after the Jewish Hospital in Cincinnati, Ohio, which was established in 1847. It opened with 45 beds on May 17, 1855, on West 28th Street in Manhattan between Seventh and Eighth Avenues, two years before Simson's death. In 1856, its first full year of operation, the new entity saw a total of 216 admissions, with five surgeons and physicians on staff and six more that had consulting positions.

The board of directors of the Jews' Hospital initially comprised Portuguese and English Jews, but soon educated German immigrant Jews were added as well. (Note: A successful charity event at Niblo's Garden in 1858, attended by Mayor Daniel F. Tiemann, illustrated that the Mount Sinai board of directors had already become one of the preeminent Jewish organizations in New York City.)

The hospital accepted only Jewish patients on a regular basis but was open to non-Jews for emergency cases. Most of these patients were poor and could not pay for any care, and by taking them in it relieved the burden on non-Jewish services to care for them and thus helped in relations between Jews and the larger community.

==== Civil War ====
Four years later, it was unexpectedly filled to capacity with soldiers injured in the American Civil War.

The Jews' Hospital felt the effects of the escalating Civil War in other ways, as staff doctors and board members were called into service. Dr. Israel Moses served four years as lieutenant colonel in the 72nd New York Infantry Regiment; Joseph Seligman had to resign as a member of the board of directors, as he was increasingly called upon by President Lincoln for advice on the country's growing financial crisis.

The New York Draft Riots of 1863 also impacted the hospital's resources, as it admitted many of the wounded.

==== Change to The Mount Sinai Hospital ====
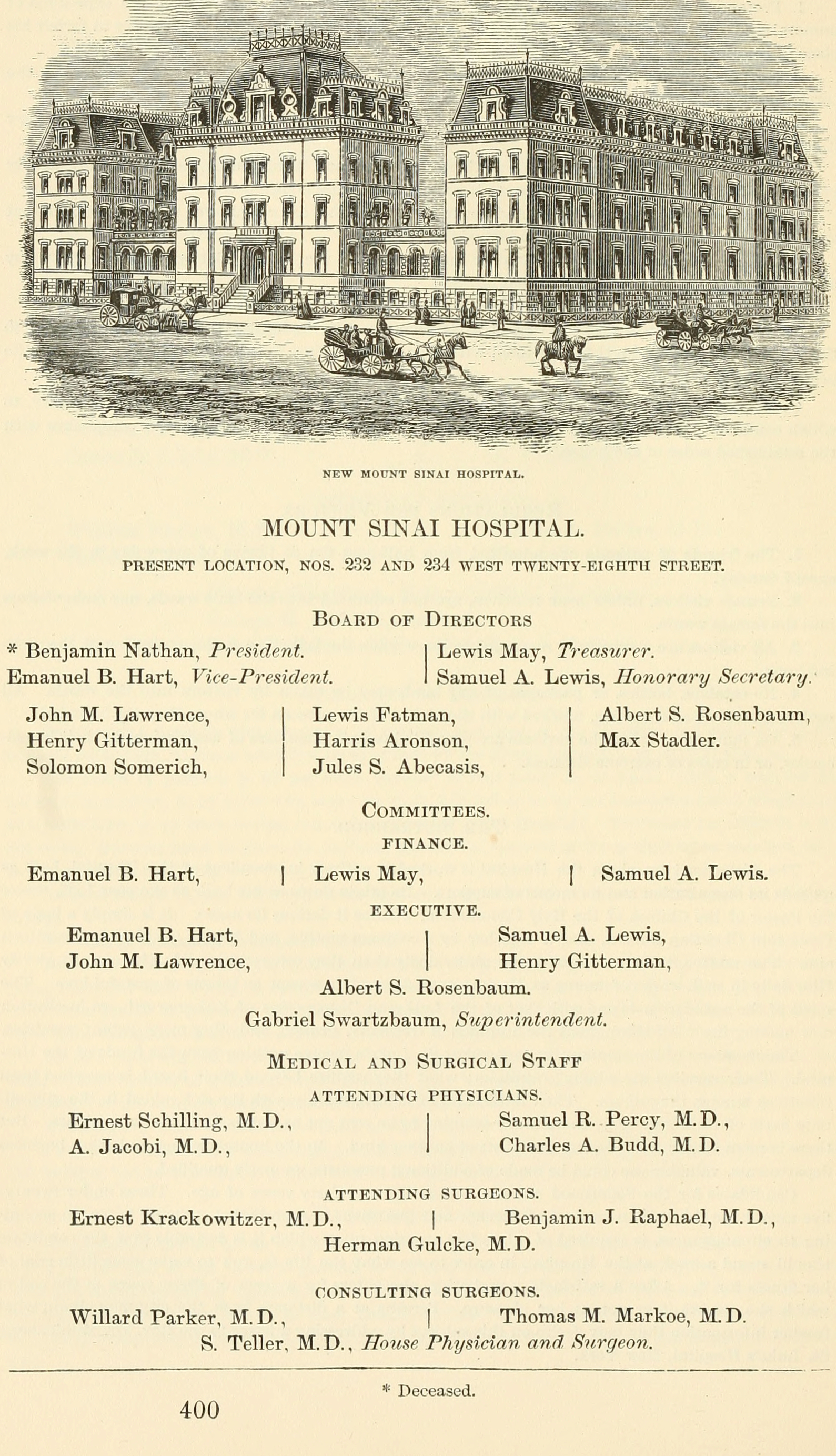
Mount Sinai directors and staff, 1870

More and more, the Jews' Hospital was finding itself an integral part of the general community, and the experiences during the Civil War convinced the hospital to adopt a more secular outlook. In 1866, to reflect this new-found role, it changed its name to Mount Sinai Hospital. This again helped in community relations, as by accepting everyone as patients it helped undermine the stereotype that Jews only cared about taking care of their own people. Becoming non-sectarian also qualified the hospital to receive public fundings.

But despite becoming non-sectarian, Mount Sinai would clearly be for many years a Jewish hospital, in that it was supported by Jewish benefactors from New York, one of its main goals was to treat poor Jewish patients, it provided training for Jewish interns and residents, and it provided long-term hospital privileges for Jewish physicians.

==== Move to the East Side ====
Annual Report of the Directors for Mount Sinai Hospital for the year 1881

Seeking more space, the hospital then moved uptown to the east side of Lexington Avenue between East 66th and 67th streets, with the new facility opening on May 29, 1872. Capacity was thrice that of before.

With the larger space, the hospital was able to expand the specialties it handled, including dermatology, eye and ear issues, neurology, and pediatrics, as well as offering outpatient services. When the pediatrics department was created in 1878, it was the first one to exist within a general hospital, and when a neurological service was established in 1900, it became the first hospital in the city to do so.

The hospital would concentrate on free care for patients throughout the rest of the 19th century. Mount Sinai was not the only Jewish hospital in the city; in particular, there was Beth Israel Hospital on the Lower East Side. (Note: The 1880s saw waves of Jewish immigrants were coming from Russia and Eastern Europe and crowding into the Lower East Side; Beth Israel Hospital was founded there, and the unassimilated Russian Jews in that neighborhood in particular found it more welcoming than Mount Sinai.) Nonetheless, Mount Sinai continued to draw patients; its Lexington Avenue site would expand in size to contain 225 beds, but still more space was needed.

=== 20th century ===
==== Move to the Upper East Side ====
The Mount Sinai Hospital forged relationships with many physicians who made contributions to medicine, including Henry N. Heineman, Frederick S. Mandelbaum, Bernard Sachs, Charles A. Elsberg, Emanuel Libman, and, most significantly, Abraham Jacobi, a champion of the move to the hospital's new site on Manhattan's Upper East Side at the beginning of the century. The motivation for changing locations was to obtain more space to accommodate the greater number of people seeking hospital services. The new location was opened on March 15, 1904, taking up the whole block between 100th and 101st Streets and Fifth and Madison Avenues, and providing a total of 456 patient beds. Contemporary reports described it as the country's largest hospital by physical size and the third-largest by patient capacity.

In 1903, S. S. Goldwater, a doctor, was appointed superintendent of the hospital, and as such became the first professional medical hospital administrator anywhere in the United States. He served in that role until 1916, after which he served as a director of the hospital until 1926.

Staff at Mount Sinai saw that social problems were often linked to medical ones, and in 1906, the first social worker was hired. A social service department was created under Goldwater's leadership, which would subsequently become known as the Department of Social Work Services. A decade later it had a staff of eighteen and a decade after that forty, growing to become one of the largest social service departments in any hospital in the nation – with a role that was especially important during traumatic periods such as the Great Depression.

The early 20th century saw the population of New York City explode. That, coupled with many new discoveries at Mount Sinai (including significant advances in blood transfusions and the first endotracheal anesthesia apparatus), meant that Mount Sinai's pool of doctors and specialists was in increasing demand.

==== World War I ====
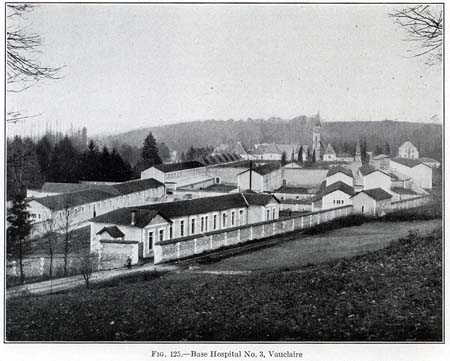
Base Hospital No. 3, Vauclaire, Dordogne, France

Mount Sinai responded to a request from the United States Army Medical Corps with the creation of Base Hospital No.3 of the American Expeditionary Forces, built around a group of doctors and nurses from Mount Sinai. This unit went to France in early 1918 and was located in an old monastery at Vauclaire in the Department of Dordogne in southwest France. It treated 9,127 patients before shutting down in early 1919. There were 172 deaths at the unit: 54 surgical and 118 medical, the latter due mainly to the effects of the influenza pandemic of 1918 to 1920.

The aftermath of the war saw the hospital dealing with not only that pandemic but also the 1919–1930 encephalitis lethargica epidemic that followed it as well as the problems of pleural empyema that could follow post-influenzal pneumonia.

==== A focus on research ====
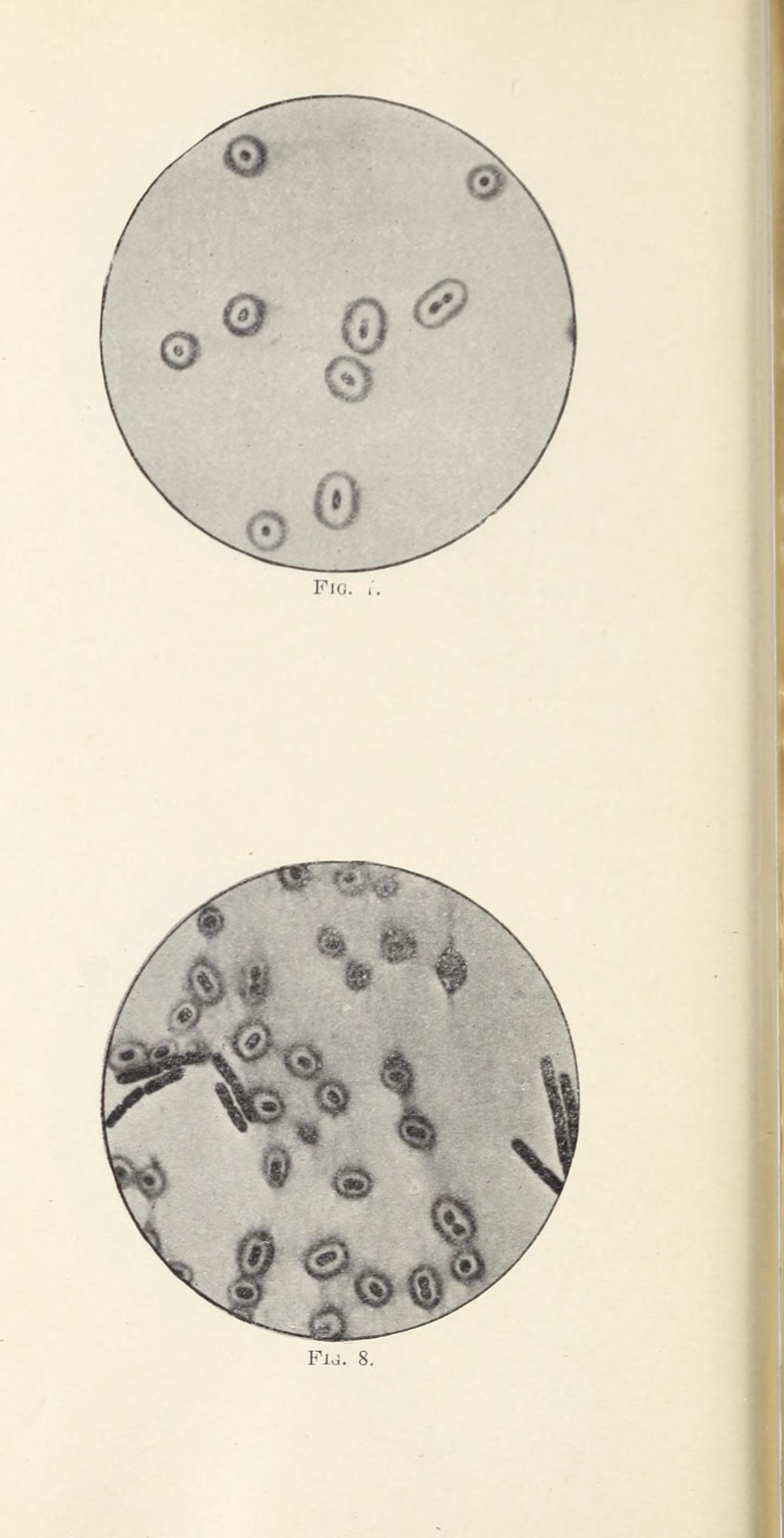
Photomicrographs from 1905 work at Mount Sinai about a new method for staining capsules of bacteria

From the early years of the 20th century on, doing medical research became an active priority at Mount Sinai. Over twenty diseases and other medical tests and techniques have been named after the doctors at Mount Sinai who discovered them, including Burrill Bernard Crohn for Crohn's disease, Bernard Sachs for Tay–Sachs disease, Gregory Shwartzman for the Shwartzman phenomenon, and Isidor Clinton Rubin for the Rubin test. At first, findings from research activities were published as part of the biennial Mount Sinai Hospital Reports series. In 1925, the hospital established a long-term research endowment fund and a medical journal in which to publish research results, as well as postgraduate teaching programs emphasizing both general care and various specialty areas. Subsequently, the Mount Sinai Journal of Medicine was founded in 1934 and would publish as a general medical journal until 2007. The demographics of the East Harlem neighborhood around two sides of Mount Sinai started changing in the 1920s, with a large influx of Puerto Ricans coming in; the hospital provided ward medical service to them.

For many years, the staff at Mount Sinai was disproportionately Jewish, in part due to many Christian-run hospitals being reluctant to hire those doctors. Not only were Jewish quotas in effect for medical schools, but hiring into internship and residency programs was even more difficult, as was getting admitting privileges at hospitals. This was especially the case in the period after World War I, when antisemitism ran high in the United States. It was these barriers that made the existence of Jewish hospitals so important, and of all the Jewish hospitals in the United States, The Mount Sinai Hospital was the most preeminent in clinical and research terms and as such attracted the brightest Jewish medical school graduates from around the country. Nonetheless, staff positions at Mount Sinai were filled via a highly competitive process designed to be impartial, and substantial numbers of non-Jews were hired as well.

==== World War II ====
The officers and nurses of the 3rd General Hospital in Camp Rucker, Alabama, shortly before being shipped overseas in 1943

With the advent of Nazi Germany in 1933, Mount Sinai allocated funds to hire and supply a sizeable number of medical doctors who were fleeing that regime. This was in contrast to elsewhere in the United States, where such émigrés had difficulty overcoming the antisemitism and xenophobia of state licensure boards in order to find placements as doctors. As German-occupied Europe began to expand, Mount Sinai worked with the National Committee for the Resettlement of Foreign Physicians to become an initial home for a number of who were given year-long externships before being assigned to other parts of the country. (Note: The National Committee for the Resettlement of Foreign Physicians was formed in 1939. An earlier organization, the Emergency Committee in Aid of Displaced German Scholars, was formed in 1933 and later renamed the Emergency Committee in Aid of Displaced Foreign Scholars, but lacked a focus on the state licensure problem for doctors.) Following American entry into World War II, Mount Sinai was the first hospital in the city to throw open its doors to Red Cross nurses' aides; the hospital trained many in its effort to reduce a nursing shortage within the United States. Meanwhile, the president of the medical board, George Baehr, M.D., was called by President Roosevelt to serve as the nation's chief medical director of the Office of Civilian Defense.

These wartime roles were eclipsed by the 3rd General Hospital of the United States Army, again built around a group of doctors and nurses from Mount Sinai. The unit was called to active service in August 1942, comprising some 55 doctors and 120 nurses. After training at Camp Rucker, Alabama, they shipped overseas and eventually establishing operations in Mateur, Tunisia in July 1943, setting up a 1,000-bed facility. The unit treated more than 5,000 wounded soldiers, mostly from the Allied invasion of Sicily. In May 1944, the 3rd General Hospital was moved to Italy, near Caserta, and then in September 1944, to southern France, in Aix-en-Provence, all the time remaining busy with cases. The unit returned home to New York in September 1945.

==== Postwar ====
Once the war was over, The Mount Sinai Hospital continued to expand its facilities.

==== Creation of the Mount Sinai School of Medicine ====
After World War II, the levels of antisemitism in the medical profession gradually declined, and after a while Mount Sinai no longer had a large advantage in being able to hire the best Jewish physicians. This posed a particular threat to Mount Sinai, with its lack of an affiliated medical school to interest academically and scientifically oriented Jewish physicians. For several decades Mount Sinai had had an arrangement with the Columbia University College of Physicians and Surgeons to provide training of some doctors. This connection was made more formal in the 1950s, but the number of medical students involved was still small and did not make up for the lack of a medical school. In addition, the kind of medical research that Mount Sinai physicians had long excelled at, based on observations of patients in the clinical wards combined with use of the hospital's laboratory facilities, was being overtaken by more sophisticated analyses with roots in the latest biomedical science.

The solution to both these trends was seen to be the creation of an affiliated medical school, even though that being done by a hospital rather a university was quite unusual. (Note: Mount Sinai's medical school was the first one to be created by a hospital rather than a university since the issuance of the landmark Flexner Report in 1910.) Thus in 1963, the hospital created a medical school, and in 1968, it welcomed the first students of the Mount Sinai School of Medicine. The City University of New York was affiliated to the school for the purpose of granting degrees. The Mount Sinai School of Medicine became the seventh medical school within New York City. A large new structure, the Annenberg Building, opened in 1974 to house the school.

==== Advent of The Mount Sinai Medical Center ====
Almost from the time the medical school was first approved, the overall combined entity began to be known as the Mount Sinai Medical Center.

The Mount Sinai Hospital conducted one of the first experiments in telemedicine during the early-mid 1970s. It used bidirectional cable television technology to link doctors at the hospital with a children's health clinic in the Robert F. Wagner Houses, a poor, largely Hispanic public housing project some two miles away in East Harlem. The clinic was staffed with nurse practitioners, who could use a heart-sound amplifier as part of relaying medical information to the Mount Sinai doctors. One motivation for the project was to find ways to extend high-quality health care into an inner city "medical ghetto". (Note: The telemedicine effort begun in 1972 was a research and development project sponsored by the United States Department of Health, Education, and Welfare. The equipment was donated by an early leader in cable television, the TelePrompTer Corporation, and included camera, video monitor, receiver, and microphones as well as a reserved coaxial line. There was a television studio within the hospital at some remove from the doctors, and which initially had some audio and video inadequacies. The pilot program was viewed as a success, but was shut down in 1975 due to its federal funding not being renewed.)

During the 1980 New York City transit strike, Mount Sinai avoided any interruption to its patient care by arranging various ways for employees to get to or stay at the facility, including expanded bicycle racks, overnight cots, and a dozen specially chartered bus routes from sites in the different boroughs to the hospital.

By the early 1980s, Mount Sinai's hospital contained 1,200 beds and its medical school graduated 100 doctors a year and its budget was almost $300 million.

==== Redevelopment of campus ====
By the early 1980s, the hospital was dealing with an aging physical plant, as several from the original 1904 opening were still in active use. Mount Sinai began a large-scale redevelopment of its Upper East Side site.

At first there were delays in gaining approval from New York State for this and other major expansion and renovation plans for hospitals within New York City. The decade of the 1980s also saw large-scale changes in how hospital funding was done due the adoption by the U.S. government of diagnosis-related groups (DRG) in connection with Medicare reimbursements as a result of a 1982 change in federal law and regulation; as a result, Mount Sinai began to focus more on marketing and the management of patient throughput. But construction on the Mount Sinai project began in 1986, and the result, centered around the large, new Guggenheim Pavilion, was opened in 1992.

By the end of the 20th century, Mount Sinai was seeing some 50,000 inpatient admissions and discharges per year, about 400,000 inpatient-days in total, along with around 300,000 outpatient visits a year.

Among the innovations at Mount Sinai were performing the first blood transplant into the vein of a fetus in 1986, and the development of a technique for inserting radioactive seeds into the prostate to treat cancer in 1995.

=== 21st century ===
==== Failed merger, financial crisis and recovery ====
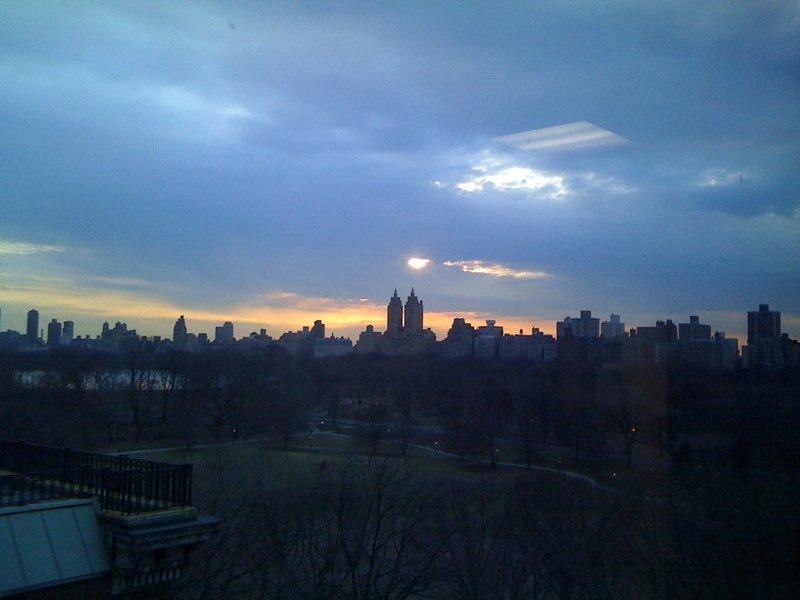
Evening view of Central Park, as seen from a room at Mount Sinai in 2010

By the mid-1990s, many hospitals were under significant financial stress and looking for form alliances or join hospital networks with larger entities such as Mount Sinai. In 1997, one such alliance and academic affiliation took place between the Saint Barnabas Health Care System of New Jersey and Mount Sinai.

A potentially much more significant transaction occurred in 1998, when Mount Sinai entered into a merger agreement with New York University Medical Center. The initial goal was to merge both the two medical schools as well as the two hospitals, but the arrangement soon ran into trouble. Subsequently, the idea was to keep the medical schools separate but merge the hospitals. But beginning in 2001, the merger was in the process of falling through completely and the two entities began to separate whatever parts they had started to merge. This turn of events left Mount Sinai in a prolonged state of organizational indecisiveness.

Furthermore, the medical center was in a period of financial crisis; by 2002, it had a budget deficit of $100 million and was cutting staff and services. Nevertheless, the turnaround was successful and Mount Sinai survived the financial strain, soon reaching a stronger state than it had been in when the merger discussions first began.

Following a $200 million (equivalent to $280 million in 2025) donation from the financier Carl Icahn, the Mount Sinai School of Medicine was renamed to the Icahn School of Medicine at Mount Sinai in 2012.

==== Advent of the Mount Sinai Health System ====
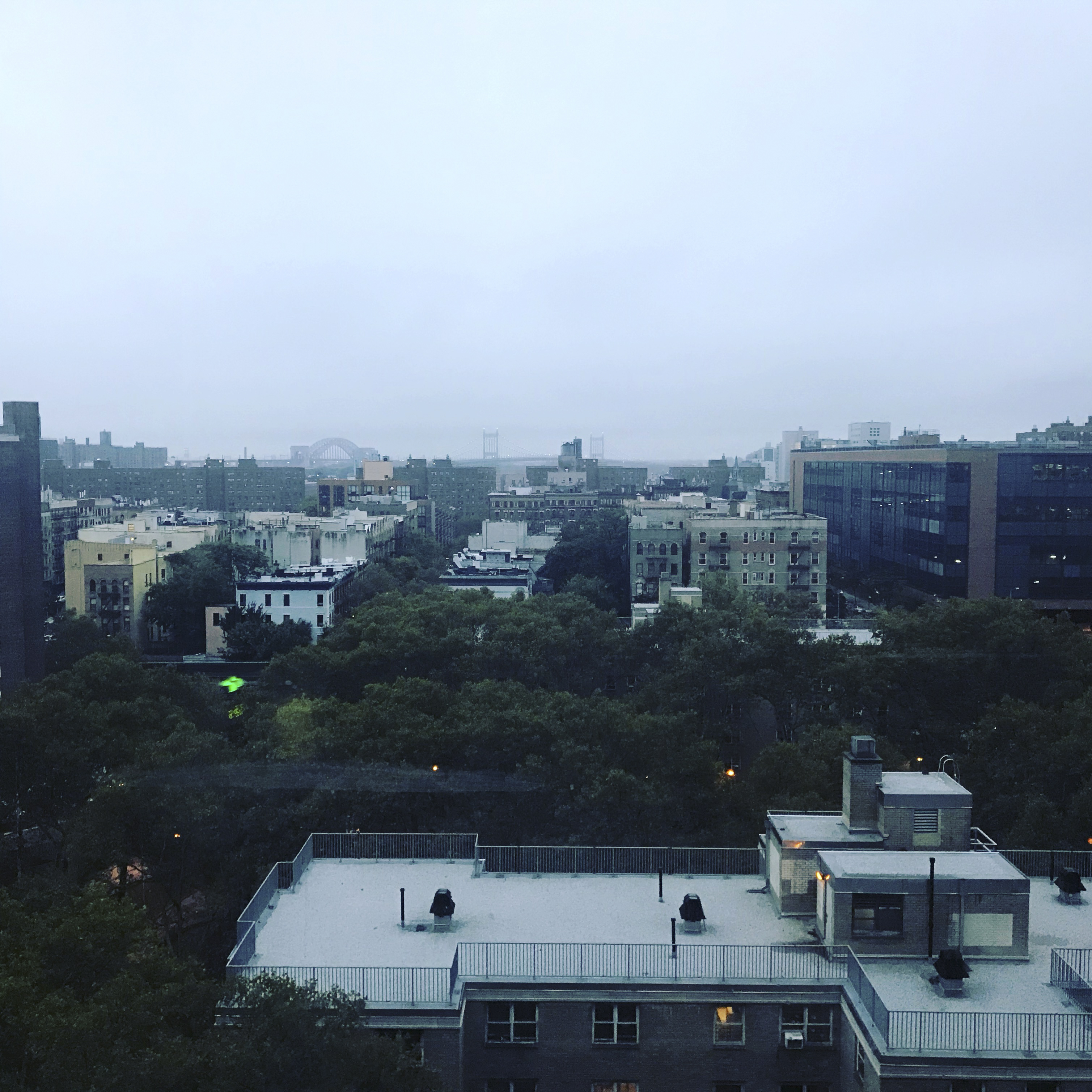
The view from an inpatient room, 2017: East Harlem and the Triborough Bridge

In January 2013 David L. Reich was the first openly gay medical doctor named interim president of Mount Sinai Hospital as reported by The New York Times. In October of the same year he was named president.

Later during the 2010s, there was a wave of consolidations within the health care industry, and Mount Sinai grew into the larger Mount Sinai Health System which featured seven hospitals overall and a network of outpatient facilities.

In August 2016, Dennis S. Charney, then dean of the medical school, was shot and wounded as he left a deli in his home town of Chappaqua, New York. Hengjun Chao, a former Mount Sinai medical researcher who had been fired by Charney for research misconduct in 2010, was convicted of attempted second degree murder and two other charges in 2017, and received a sentence of 28 years.

In late February 2020, a woman was admitted to Mount Sinai's emergency room, in what would become the first confirmed case of COVID-19 in New York State. As one Mount Sinai doctor later said, it "was the beginning of hell." President and COO Reich announced in late March 2020 that the hospital was converting Guggenheim Pavilion lobbies into extra patient rooms to "meet the growing volume of patients" that had contracted COVID-19. As with other hospitals in the city, the nurses and other medical staff of Mount Sinai were soon celebrated as heroes during the dark initial period of the COVID-19 pandemic in New York City.

Efforts at Mount Sinai regarding realizing some of the goals that would later become known as diversity, equity, and inclusion began in 2000 and were renewed in 2016. They then gained special emphasis with the creation of a Task Force to Address Racism in 2020 in reaction to the murder of George Floyd.

In August 2024, Moody's Investor Service downgraded Mount Sinai Hospital and Icahn School of Medicine to its lowest investment grade, Baa3. Moody's cited $1.8 billion in debt by the end of 2023, initial delays in closing the merged but struggling Mount Sinai Beth Israel, and cash flow damages due to a cyber-attack in February 2024 at Mount Sinai’s payment system, Change Healthcare.

In early 2026, there was a strike by nurses of the New York State Nurses Association against both the main campus of The Mount Sinai Hospital as well as two other hospitals within the Mount Sinai Health System. The strike, which lasted a month before being settled, caused serious disruptions, with elective surgeries not taking place and patients sometimes being moved to uninvolved hospitals; Mount Sinai spent many millions of dollars hiring temporary replacement nurses during the work outage. The labor action was over not just pay rates but demands by the nurses for increased minimum staffing levels at the hospitals, for better protections against violent patients, and for safeguards against certain uses of artificial intelligence.

== Campus and expansion ==
=== Initial West Side location ===
Sampson Simson donated the hospital's first site on West 28th Street in Manhattan, between Seventh and Eighth Avenues, with the cornerstone being laid on November 25, 1852. It opened with 45 beds on May 17, 1855. The cost of the new structure was $30,000 (equivalent to $1,037,000 in 2025).

=== Lexington Avenue location ===
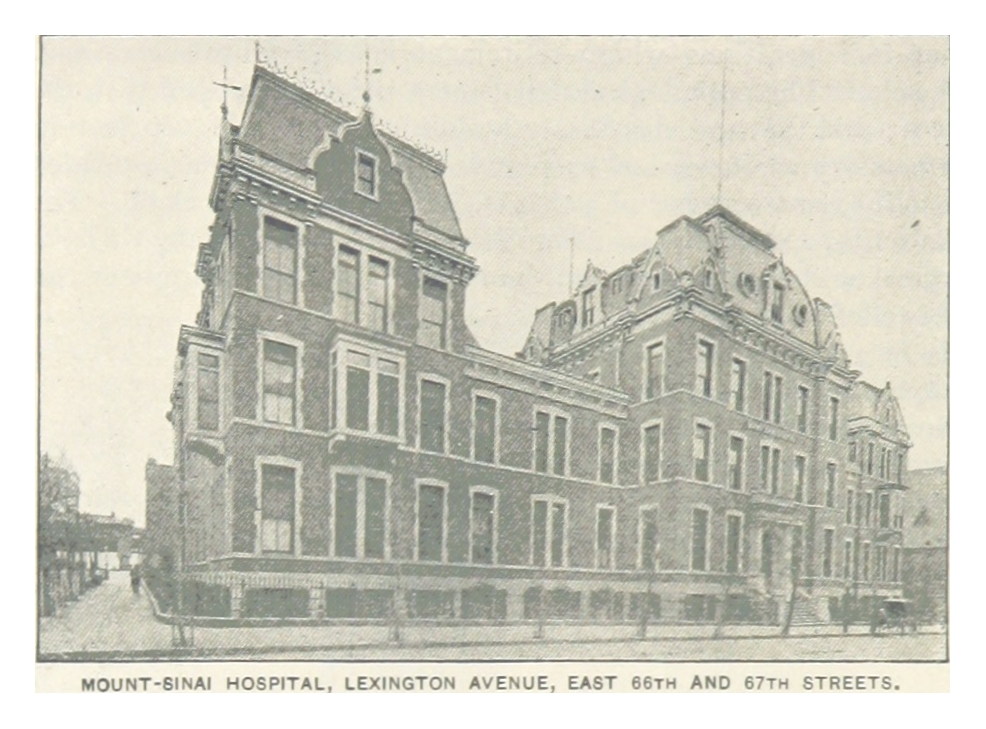
The Lexington Avenue hospital in 1893

Seeking more space, the hospital then moved uptown to the east side of Lexington Avenue between East 66th and 67th streets. (Note: The land for the Lexington Avenue location was leased by the city to the hospital for only nominal payment, a municipal strategy for spurring development that during the same time also benefited other hospitals, schools, and museums.)

The cornerstone ceremony at the new location took place on May 25, 1870, with some 1,500 people in attendance and speeches delivered by Mayor A. Oakey Hall and Judge Albert Cardozo. The dedication for the opening of the buildings took place on May 29, 1872, with an address given by Governor John T. Hoffman. The cost of the new facility was $340,000 (equivalent to $9,138,000 in 2025). Capacity was thrice that of before, although for a while the new location had a synagogue but lacked an operating room.

=== Upper East Side campus ===
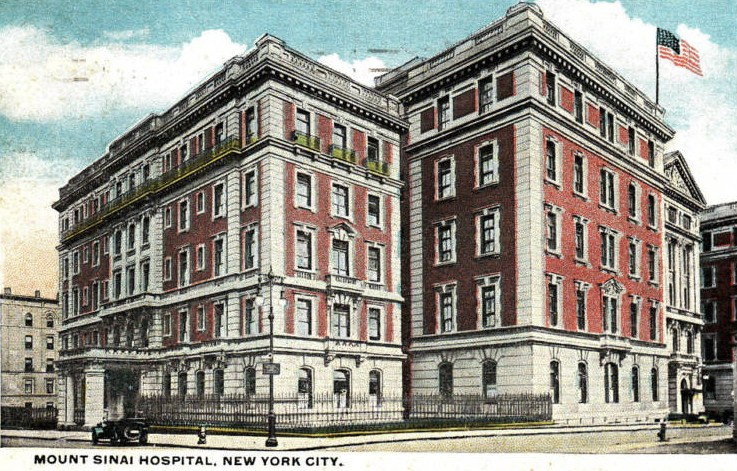
The Upper East Side campus pictured in a 1920 postcard

The motivation for changing locations was to obtain more space to accommodate the greater number of people seeking hospital services; an advantage of the new site was the reduction in the amount of nearby urban commotion by virtue of one side of the site being alongside Central Park.

Building at the new location began in 1901. In particular, on May 22, 1901, the cornerstone ceremony for construction at the new location was held on Fifth Avenue and 100th Street. Temporary viewing stands were erected, and several thousand people were in attendance. Speeches were given by dignitaries such as Randolph Guggenheimer and Seth Low. A common theme was that while the history of the hospital reflected the ideals of Judaism, it would continue benefit all people of any religion or race.

The new location was officially opened and dedicated on March 15, 1904, with a speech given by Governor Benjamin Odell. The hospital consisted of ten buildings, which together took up the whole block between 100th and 101st Streets and Fifth and Madison Avenues. There were corridors connecting the structures, as from the beginning, having underground passages that would link the buildings had been part of the plan. There were 456 patient beds altogether, spread across the five of the buildings that were patient pavilions. The other buildings were for administrative, maintenance, laboratory, and other support functions. The buildings were constructed of brick and limestone. As at the prior location, a synagogue was included in the administrative building. The new facility was said to be the largest hospital in the United States in size and the third largest in terms of patient capacity. The total cost of the new location was upwards of $3 million (equivalent to $107 million in 2025), most of which came from Jewish benefactors.

=== Twentieth-century expansion ===
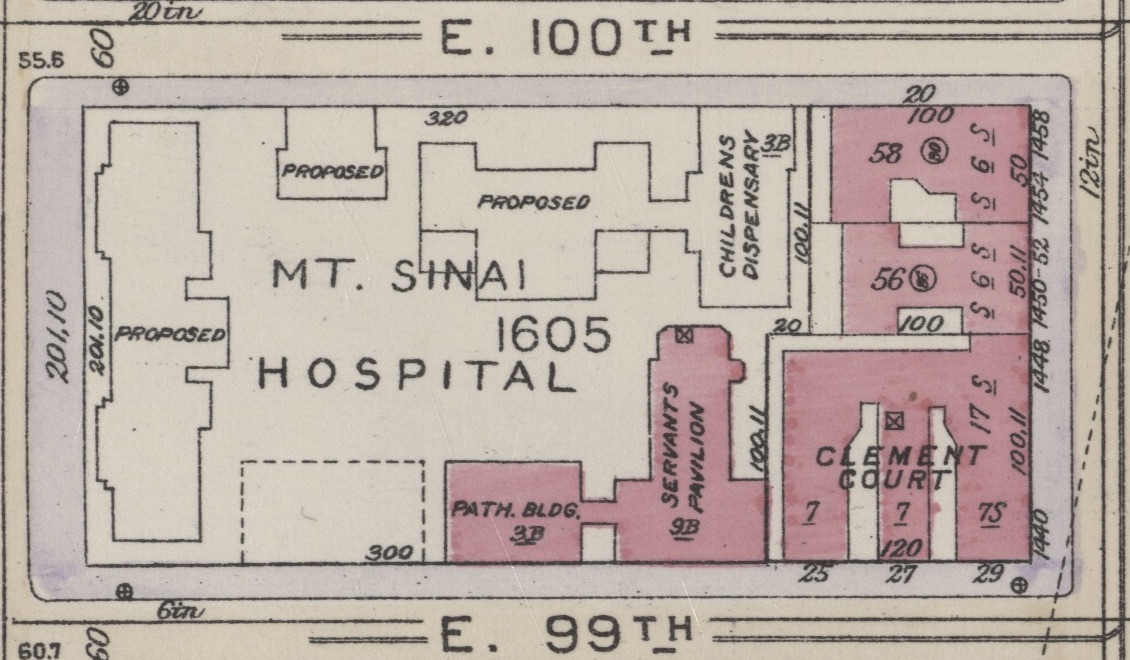
The hospital with proposed buildings map in 1916

The hospital soon envisioned a building program along the south side of 100th Street in order to expand further, and then a goal of reaching down to 99th Street based upon a plan adopted in 1913. A $1.35 million ($48,400,000 in current dollar terms) expansion of the 1904 hospital site raced to keep pace with demand. The opening of the new buildings was postponed by the advent of World War I.

Totaling seven new structures, the last three of the 1913 building program were not completed until 1922, construction having been delayed not just by the war but also by the era's accompanying high prices. Some improvements to the 1904 buildings were also made during this time.

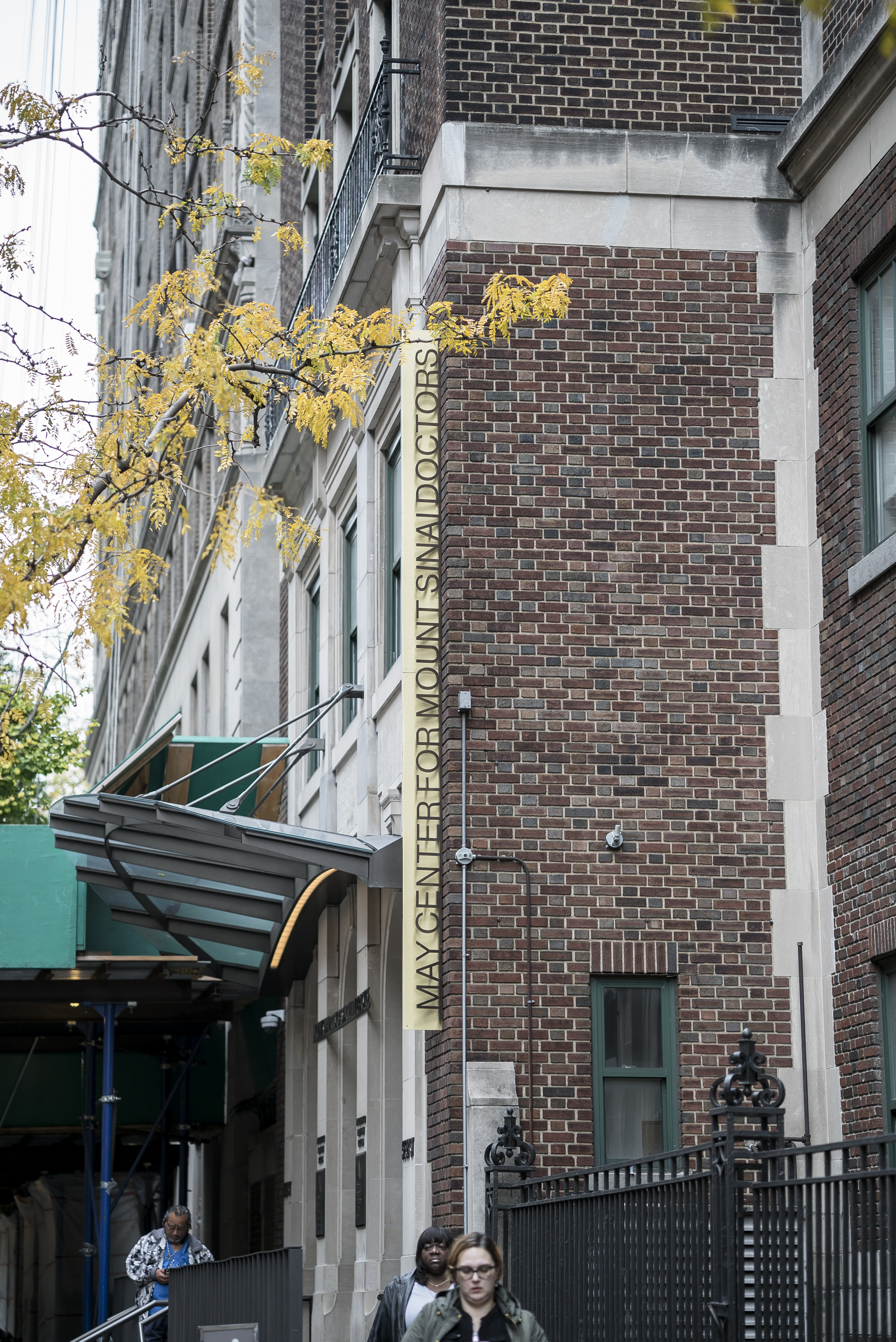
Representing the southern edge of the campus, the building at 5 East 98th Street was the location of the Mount Sinai Hospital School of Nursing and has subsequently held doctors' offices and administrative spaces.

In 1925, the Mount Sinai campus expanded to the north side of 98th Street, with the start of construction of a 14-story building for the School of Nursing that included both educational and dormitory floors and that had an expected cost of $2 million (equivalent to $37 million in 2025). The building would become known both as Guggenheim Hall and by its street address, 5 East 98th Street. As was the practice on the campus, the building was connected to the others by an underground corridor.

After its nursing school days, 5 East 98th Street has served several roles, most commonly as a space for doctors' offices. From the same era and next to it is 19 East 98th Street, among whose roles has been to house the personnel department. The northern side of 98th Street has remained the lower bound of the campus.

In the post-World War II era, the year 1952 saw the opening of three buildings along the 99th Street portion of the campus: the Klingenstein Pavilion, which housed the maternity pavilion, the Berg Laboratory, and the Atran Laboratory. In 1962, the Kingenstein Clinical Center was opened, which included a large psychiatric unit with 137 beds. Taking up the full block between 99th and 100th Streets, it became the most prominent Mount Sinai building along the Madison Avenue side. And these portions of 99th and 100th Streets themselves ceased to exist as such. (Note: In 1949, 100th Street stopped being a thoroughfare between Madison and Fifth Avenues as the city gave the rights to it to Mount Sinai, which used it for parking for a while until it vanished under 1980s era renovation work. The similar block of 99th Street was deeded from the city to Mount Sinai in 1958, becoming the Hospital Gardens for a while before the advent of the Annenberg Building, when it became part of a campus open-air area.)

=== Impact of the Mount Sinai School of Medicine: the Annenberg Building ===
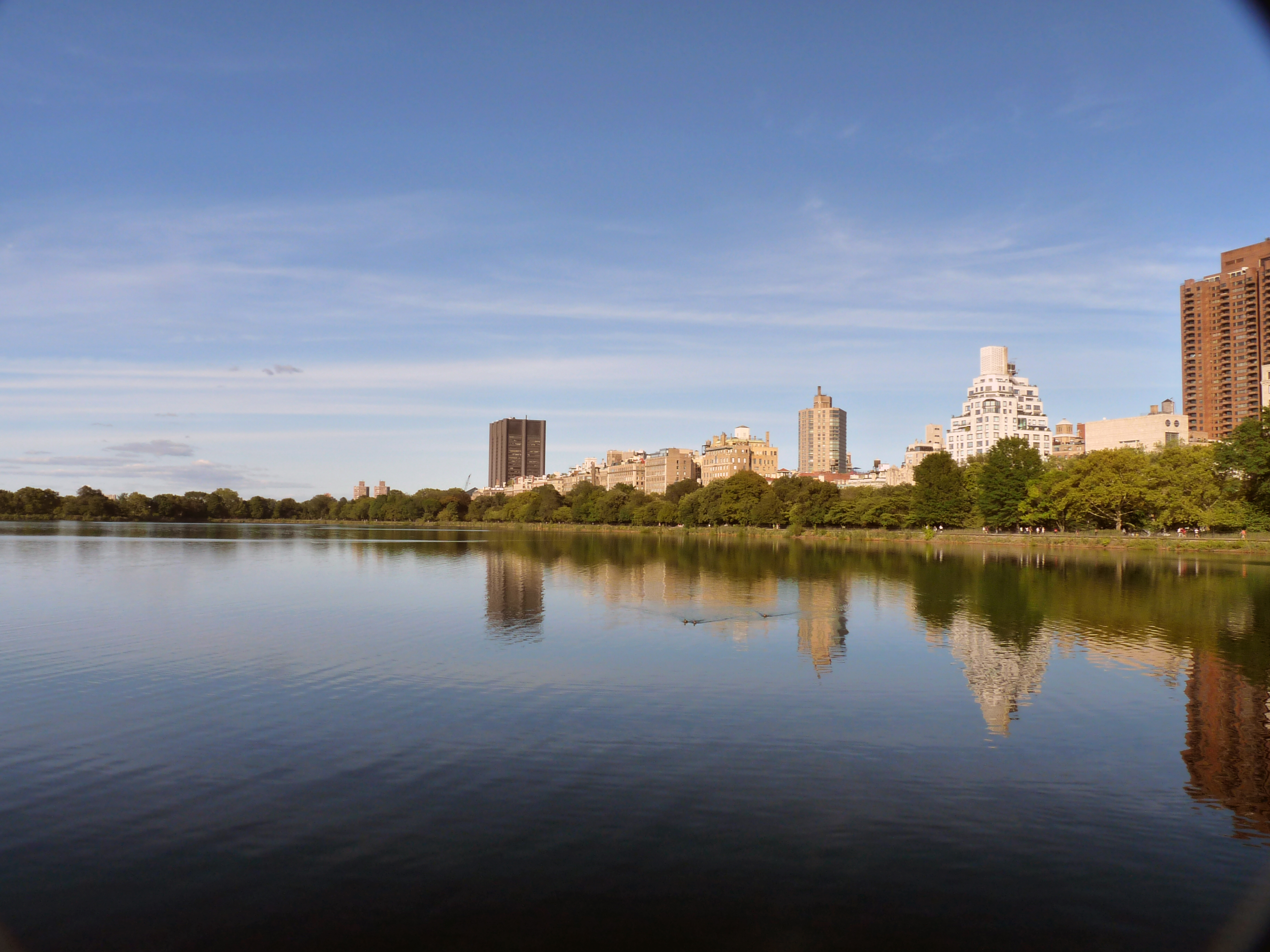
Once it was constructed, the Annenberg Building (left center) dominated the skyline over the upper reaches of the Central Park Reservoir

In the 1960s, the initial site for the new medical school was a converted and renovated bus garage that previously kept in store the city's Fifth and Madison Avenues buses. Located at 10 East 102nd Street, Mount Sinai paid $7 million (equivalent to $65 million in 2025) for the facility, which would subsequently become known as the Cummings Basic Sciences Building. But the plan was already underway to construct the large new building to house the school on a permanent basis, and for which construction began in 1970.

That new structure was the Annenberg Building, a voluminous, 437-foot (133 m) tall rust-colored steel structure at Fifth Avenue and 100th Street. It was said to be the largest medical school structure in the world at the time. The dedication for the building was given in 1974 by Vice President Gerald Ford, whose remarks discussed various ideas for improving the availability of health insurance coverage in the United States. More than half of the new building was occupied by the medical school, with the balance allocated to various forms of advanced medical analysis and treatment. Designed by Skidmore, Owings & Merrill, the building was much larger than its immediate neighbors and, in the words of architecture critic Paul Goldberger, "dominates—no, destroys is more the word—the skyline" over the northern portion of Central Park. The building cost $117 million (equivalent to $764 million in 2025); following substantial contributions by the businessman and diplomat Walter Annenberg and his siblings, it was named for their mother, with some funds also coming from other private donations as well as from federal and state sources. Years after its opening, the Annenberg Building would still be viewed as controversial in its appearance and effect upon the skyline.

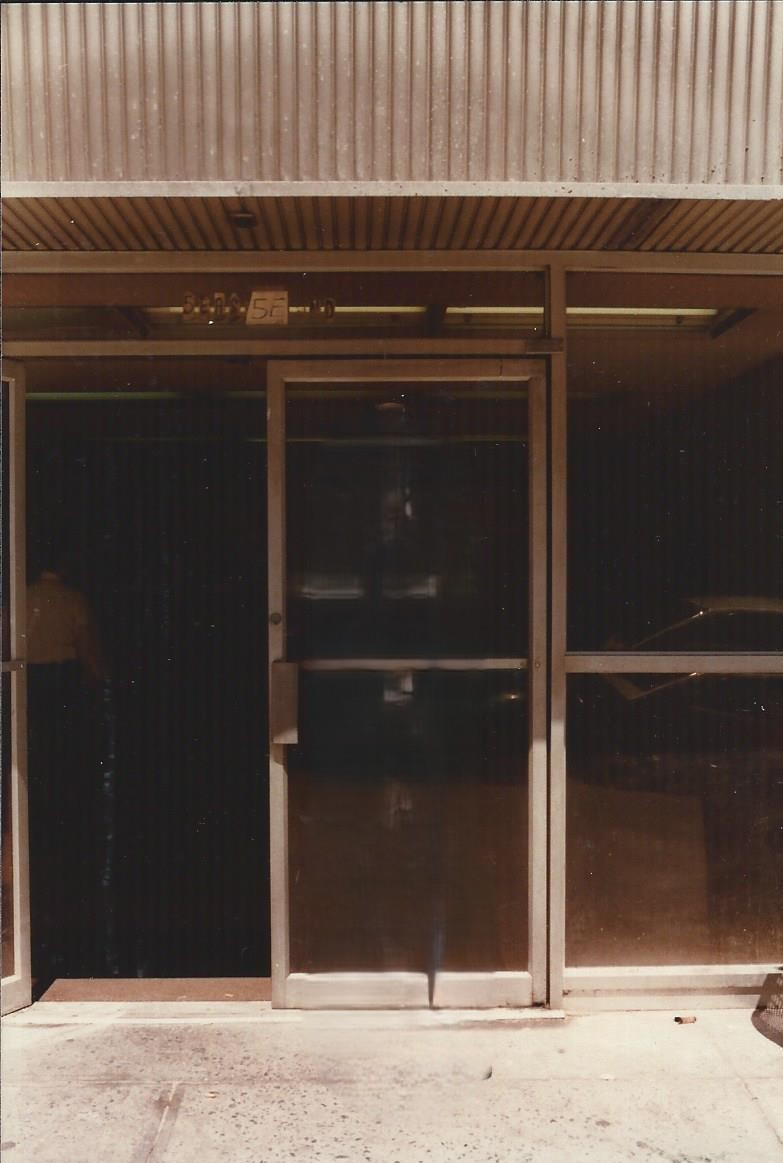
The northernmost building on the Mount Sinai campus, 5 East 102nd Street, housed the electronic data processing and accounting/finance departments when seen here in 1980

The upper bound of the campus has long been found on the northern side of East 102nd Street. This is an eight-story building at 5 East 102nd that was used both as office space and a parking garage; a couple of the floors of the building were occupied by Mount Sinai's electronic data processing and accounting and finance departments. In contrast, the eighth floor was occupied by a drug treatment facility run by New York Medical College. In the late 2000s the building underwent a substantial renovation, becoming the Center for Advanced Medicine. Opening in 2008 with the expanded address of 5–17 East 102nd Street, it houses various Mount Sinai medical functions including outpatient services.

=== Campus redevelopment: the Guggenheim Pavilion ===
By the early 1980s, the hospital was dealing with an aging physical plant, as several from the original 1904 opening were still in active use. Overall, the Mount Sinai campus was an "architectural hodgepodge", in the words of the New York Times: there were 21 buildings in all, including some ornamented red-brick buildings, white-brick structures, service buildings, and various other structures. They acted as pavilions, clinical centers, labs, halls, annexes, and other facilities. Most of buildings were connected via a heavily trafficked underground passageway, known as the B-1 Level. Many kinds of traffic went through these corridors: patients being transported, food carts being wheeled, staff going to meetings, visitors, security guards, all mixed together.

Accordingly, in the early 1980s, Mount Sinai began a large-scale redevelopment of its campus under the aegis of the architect I. M. Pei, the first medical facility designed by him, and began a public fundraising drive to raise the monies necessary to make it possible. The New York Times characterized Pei's renovation proposal as "one of the most extensive and innovation plans ever proposed by a major hospital in the country."

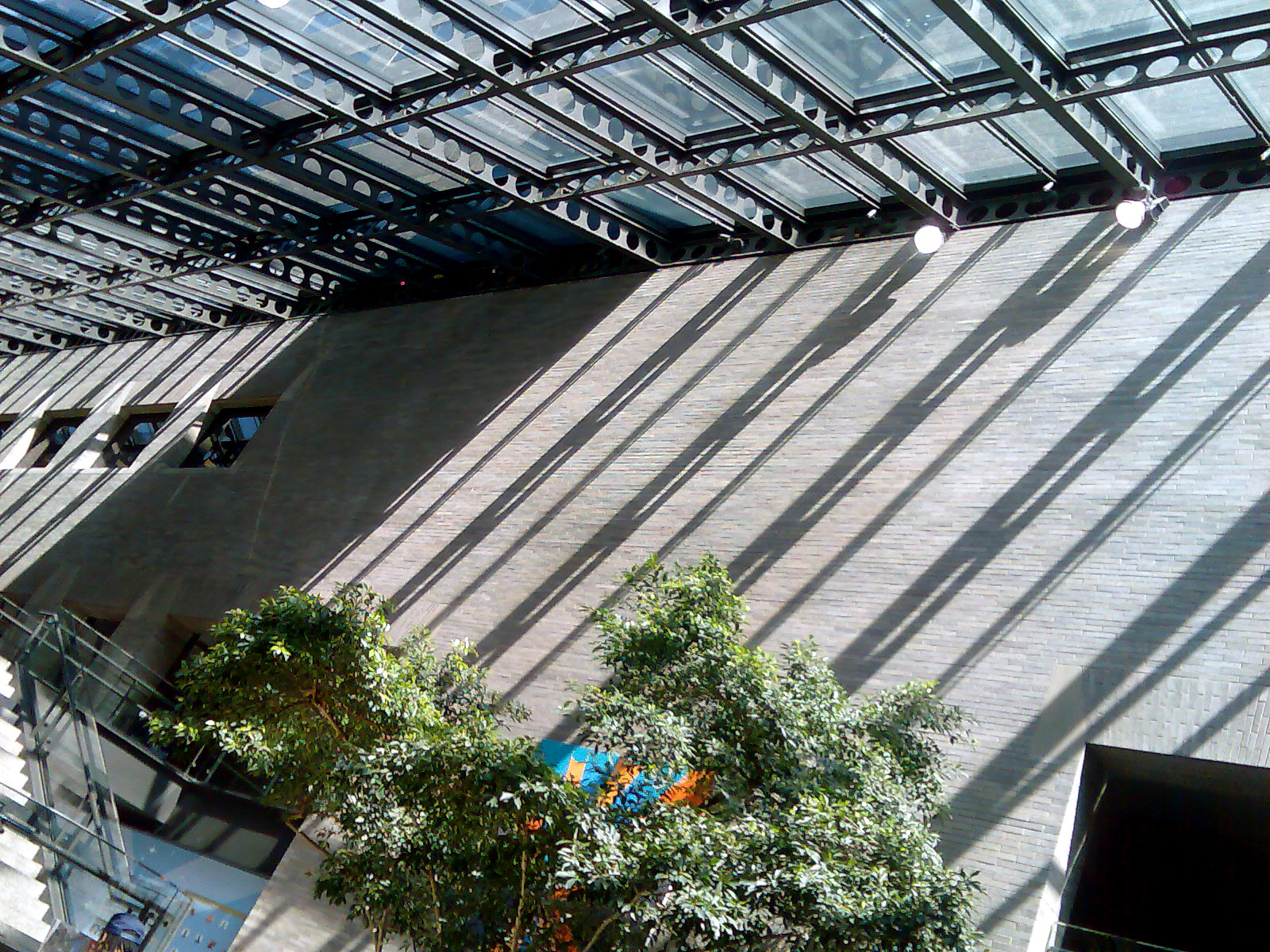
The Guggenheim Pavilion atrium, as seen in 2008

Eleven buildings and structures between 100th and 101st Streets were demolished as part of the work, to make way for the new Pei-designed Guggenheim Pavilion, a 1,000,000 square feet (93,000 m^{2}) structure that was dedicated in 1992. The new facility, which was architecturally coordinated by the firms Pei Cobb Freed & Partners in conjunction with Ellerbe Associates, featured a pair of large, naturally lit atriums and a goal of relieving some of the stress of the patient experience. The effort also involved the renovation of three other pavilions engaged in patient care. The Guggenheim Pavilion itself cost $200 million (equivalent to $459 million in 2025, while the overall cost of the entire redevelopment project was $500 million (equivalent to $1,147 million in 2025. Architecture critic Herbert Muschamp gave extensive praise to Pei's work on the Guggenheim Pavilion, calling it "lucid in organization, lustrous in space", while an assessment in Architecture: The AIA Journal called it "an urban project that performs well both within Mount Sinai's sprawling complex and within Manhattan's Upper East Side."

=== Subsequent expansions ===
On the other side of Madison Avenue between 98th and 99th Streets was parking space run the by medical center; this was subsequently replaced by a large new building,primarily devoted to biomedical and other research, which opened in 1997 at a cost of $200 million (equivalent to $401 million in 2025) and was initially known as the East Building. When Carl Icahn donated $25 million to The Mount Sinai Medical Center for advanced medical research in 2004, the building was renamed to the Icahn Medical Institute.

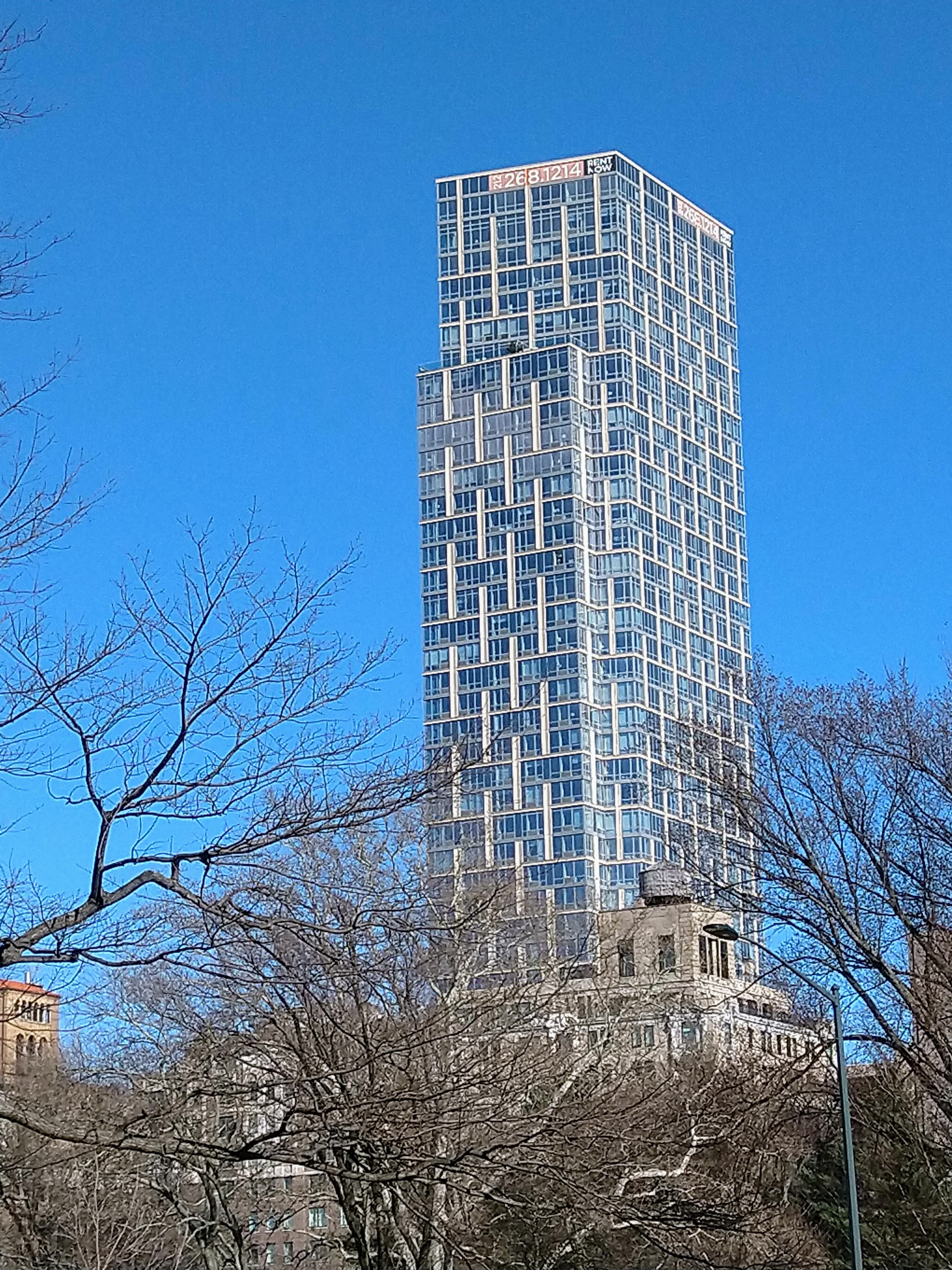
10 East 102nd Street: lower floors medical facilities, upper floors private residences

Two additional large buildings appeared during the early 2010s, as part of another major expansion. The Leon and Norma Hess Center for Science and Medicine, located on Madison Avenue between 101st and 102nd streets, opened in 2012 as a clinical and laboratory complex for research into such areas as cancer, heart disease, issues of the brain, the human genome, and advanced imaging.

Also opening in 2012 was a 500-foot (150 m) tower on the south side of 102nd Street between Madison Avenue and Fifth Avenue, which has lower floors housing Mount Sinai facilities, while the upper floors are residential. The medical facilities part of the building has the address 10 E. 102nd Street. (Note: In contrast, the residential portion of the 10 E. 102nd Street tower has a Fifth Avenue address, even though the building is not on that thoroughfare, due to a special consideration granted by the Manhattan Borough president's office after Mount Sinai indicated they needed the higher rents that a more prestigious address would bring in order to balance anticipated lower federal healthcare spending. Nonetheless, making use of the New York State Housing Finance Agency's 80/20 housing and 421-a tax exemption provisions, twenty percent of the residential units were set aside for low-income residents.)

=== Current campus ===
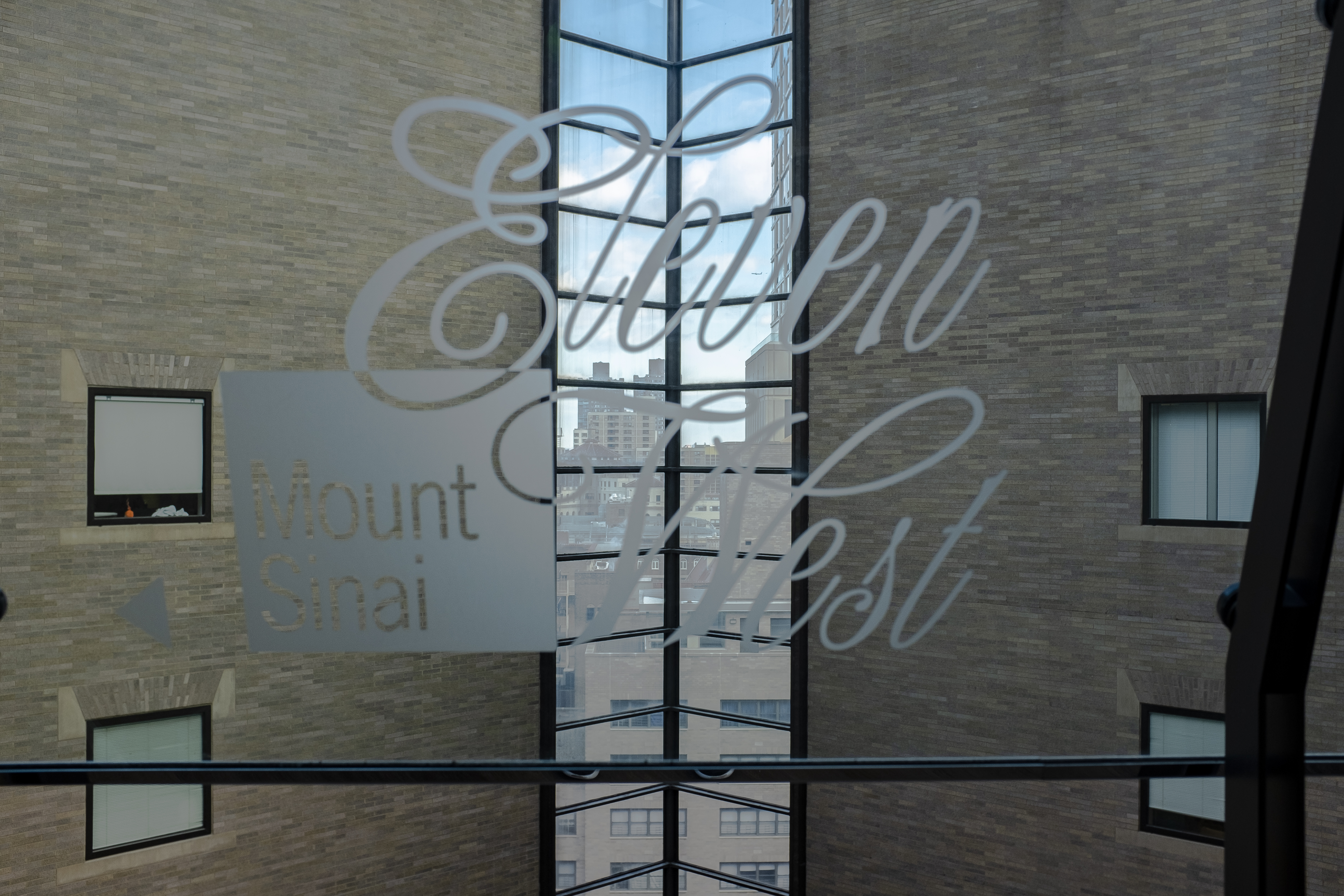
Eleven West: premium patient accommodations, as seen in 2019

The main Mount Sinai campus extends from East 98th to 102nd streets between Fifth and Madison avenues. It includes hospital, outpatient, research, and medical-school buildings, including the Guggenheim Pavilion, Annenberg Building, Icahn Medical Institute, and facilities of the Icahn School of Medicine at Mount Sinai.

Like some other major hospitals, Mount Sinai has an "amenities unit" that gives exclusive, pampering service for wealthy patients willing to pay extra for health care. Known as "Eleven West", It opened in the mid-1990s, was refurbished in the early 2010s, and brings the hospital several million dollars a year in revenue.

== Present-day hospital ==
=== Clinical services ===
The hospital provides inpatient, outpatient, emergency, and surgical care across adult and pediatric specialties. Its major programs include cardiovascular medicine and surgery, cancer care, transplantation, neurology and neurosurgery, gastroenterology, geriatrics, orthopedics, obstetrics and gynecology, rehabilitation, and urology. New York State lists medical-surgical, intensive-care, maternity, psychiatric, rehabilitation, pediatric, and neonatal beds at the hospital and designates it as an AIDS center, a Sexual Assault Forensic Examiner hospital, a Comprehensive Stroke Center, and a Regional Perinatal Center.

=== Specialty hospitals and centers ===
==== Mount Sinai Kravis Children's Hospital ====
The Mount Sinai Kravis Children's Hospital is a pediatric acute-care hospital located on the Mount Sinai campus. It provides pediatric specialties and subspecialties to patients from infancy through age 21. It is affiliated with the Icahn School of Medicine at Mount Sinai and is a member of the Mount Sinai Health System.

==== Mount Sinai Tisch Cancer Center ====
The Mount Sinai Tisch Cancer Center is the cancer research and clinical-care enterprise of the Mount Sinai Health System. It was established in 2008 as The Tisch Cancer Institute through a gift from James Tisch and Merryl Tisch and became a National Cancer Institute-designated Clinical Cancer Center in 2015. The NCI awarded it Comprehensive Cancer Center designation effective September 24, 2025, and Mount Sinai subsequently renamed it the Mount Sinai Tisch Cancer Center.

The center coordinates cancer research, clinical trials, inpatient and outpatient care, and specialized treatment programs across the Mount Sinai Health System. Its clinical locations include the Derald H. Ruttenberg Treatment Center and Dubin Breast Center at the Mount Sinai campus, as well as facilities elsewhere in New York City.

As of 2026, a dedicated inpatient facility is under construction within a renovated building on The Mount Sinai Hospital campus. The 300,000-square-foot (28,000 m^{2}) Mount Sinai Tisch Cancer Hospital will contain 72 single-patient rooms and a dedicated oncology care unit and is expected to open in 2030.

=== Affiliations ===
Mount Sinai has a number of hospital affiliates in the New York metropolitan area, including the Brooklyn Hospital Center, which is a clinical affiliate of The Mount Sinai Hospital and an academic affiliate of the Icahn School of Medicine, and an additional campus, Mount Sinai Queens. The hospital is also affiliated with the Icahn School of Medicine at Mount Sinai, which opened in September 1968.

In 2013, The Mount Sinai Medical Center joined with Continuum Health Partners in the creation of the Mount Sinai Health System. The system encompasses the Icahn School of Medicine at Mount Sinai and seven hospital campuses in the New York metropolitan area, as well as a large, regional ambulatory footprint. This includes clinical and academic relationships in the New York metropolitan area and in Florida.

== Medical education and research ==
=== Icahn School of Medicine affiliation ===
The Mount Sinai Hospital founded the Mount Sinai School of Medicine in 1963, and the hospital and school continue to share the Upper East Side campus. The school was renamed the Icahn School of Medicine at Mount Sinai in 2012. It is the medical school of the Mount Sinai Health System, and The Mount Sinai Hospital is one of its principal clinical training sites. Medical students, residents, and fellows receive clinical training at the hospital and at other Mount Sinai Health System facilities.

=== Medical research and innovations ===
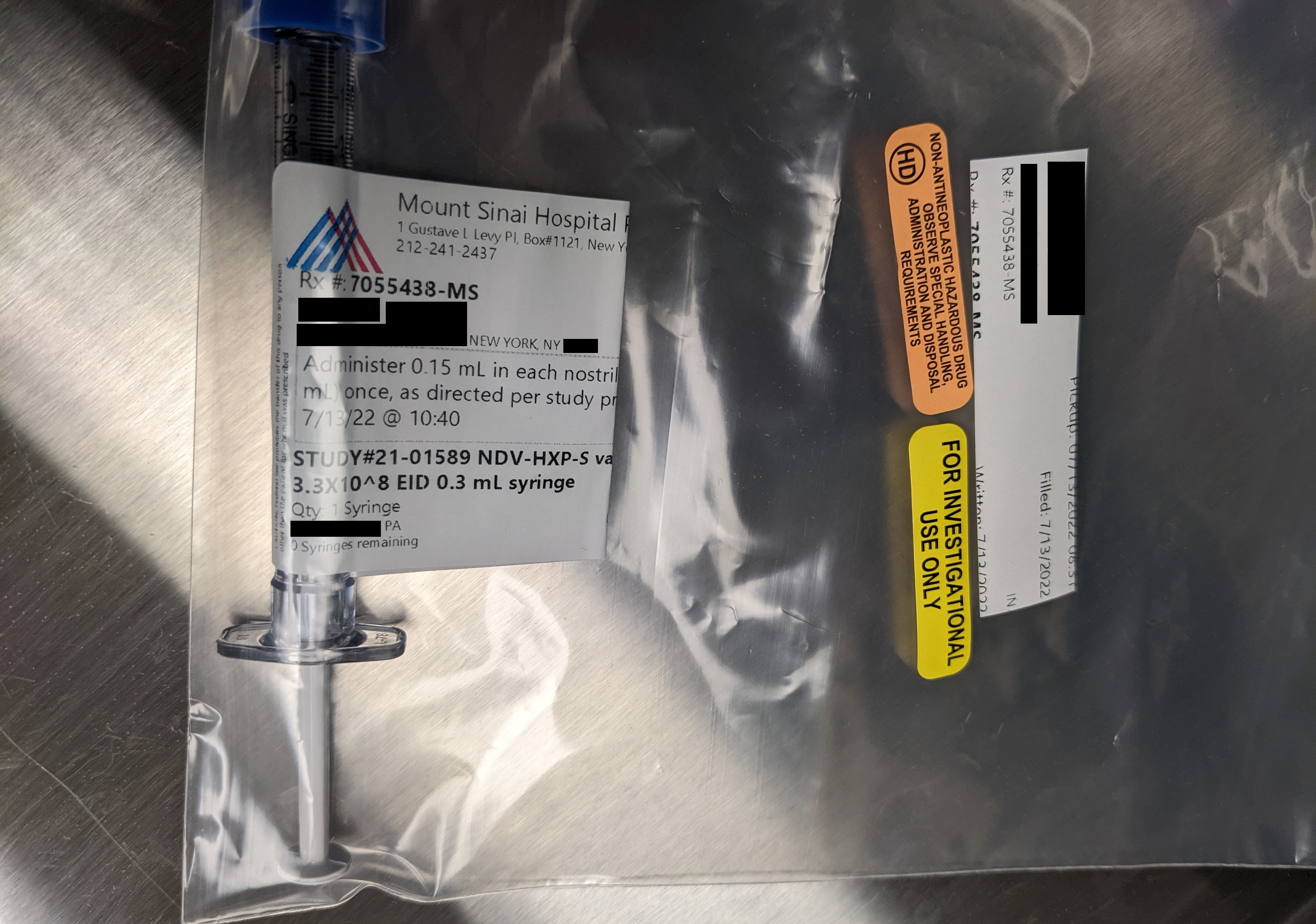
New COVID-19 vaccine investigation at Mount Sinai, 2022

Later research and clinical milestones on the Mount Sinai campus include the 2001 identification by a team led by Bruce Gelb of mutations in PTPN11 as a cause of Noonan syndrome. In 2005, Peter Palese, Adolfo García-Sastre, and colleagues at the medical school prepared the genetic material used by the Centers for Disease Control and Prevention to reconstruct the 1918 influenza virus for research.

In 2014, Vivek Reddy implanted the Nanostim device in the first United States patient to receive that model of leadless cardiac pacemaker, beginning a pivotal clinical trial. Under the federal HOPE Act program, Mount Sinai became a major center for transplants using organs from HIV-positive donors for HIV-positive recipients; by September 2020 it had performed 67 such procedures, more than any other hospital at that time. In 2020, a Mount Sinai team developed and validated a SARS-CoV-2 antibody test that received emergency-use authorization from the Food and Drug Administration. In January 2021, a surgical team led by Eric M. Genden performed the first successful human tracheal transplant.

=== Mount Sinai Hospital School of Nursing ===
The hospital established a school of nursing in 1881, introducing professional training into what had previously been a system of untrained attendants. Created by Alma deLeon Hendricks and a small group of women, the Mount Sinai Hospital Training School for Nurses was taken over by the hospital in 1895 and renamed the Mount Sinai Hospital School of Nursing in 1923.

Graduates of the school worked at Mount Sinai and elsewhere in the United States and abroad. Like other hospital-run nursing schools, it eventually faced financial pressures and a growing preference for bachelor's-degree nursing education. The school closed in 1971 after graduating 4,700 students, all women except for one man in the final class. The last graduation ceremony was held at Assembly Hall at Hunter College. (Note: There were attempts to continue the nursing school under the aegis of the City College of New York. The effort faltered, however, and the arrangement was ended in 1974.) An active alumnae association continues to exist.

The Mount Sinai Hospital School of Nursing was distinct from the present-day Mount Sinai Phillips School of Nursing, which originated as the Beth Israel School of Nursing and became part of the Mount Sinai Health System through the 2013 merger with Beth Israel Medical Center.

== Information science trends ==
The hospital opened a medical library in 1883, and within a couple of years it had around 10,000 volumes. In 1910, the library was renamed the Abraham Jacobi Library to honor of one Mount Sinai's most significant figures. The field of medical librarianship became established in the 1940s, led by courses at the Columbia University School of Library Service, and the hospital hired its first full-time, professional librarian in 1946. The library continued to grow, and by the 1960s had eight librarians and two dozen either full- or part-time staff members working there.

In 1965, Mount Sinai became the first hospital in the United States to install an IBM System/360 computer, seeking to expand the capacity and speed of its data processing operations. Indeed, it was said to be the first hospital in the world to do so, and the first of any type of organization within New York City. It was used for storing, retrieving, and processing administrative data as well as for scientific applications. A promotional photograph showed two men in suits over a computer terminal while three nurses in the white uniforms and caps of the time looked on. Once the Mount Sinai School of Medicine was in existence, it tended to have its own computer systems. The Laboratory of Computer Science was in existence within the school, having been created during the early 1970s. It used DEC PDP-11 minicomputers. It featured access using early video display terminals for some medical personnel, while others accessed it via Teletype Model 33 machines.

In contrast, for administrative applications, the Mount Sinai Hospital, and the Mount Sinai Medical Center as a whole, remained an IBM mainframe shop. The mid-to-late 1970s saw the first online applications appear at Mount Sinai, running at IBM 3270 terminals under control of CICS: these included admissions-discharges-transfers, outpatient visit recording, and some medical records, but in this era most applications were still run via batch processing from manually submitted forms, so for instance while the pharmacy profile system was online, the drugs and stores inventory was batch. Indeed, the Mount Sinai data processing department was profiled in Computerworld newspaper in 1980 as having been an early adopter, and still heavy user, of computer output microfiche, including via the Kodak Komstar, with some 188,000 frames of reports being produced per month for applications such as patient history, inpatient census, inpatient billing, outpatient records, personnel, and payroll. Many investments in computer application systems, such as those for tracking preventive maintenance, were motivated in part by the need to satisfy regulatory bodies.

With the creation of the medical school and the opening of the Annenberg Building, the Gustave L. and Janet W. Levy Library was created in 1974. Libraries sometimes existed elsewhere in the hospital as well, such as a professionally run one in the data processing department for documentation and other process functions. The Levy Library began a years-long course of improving its computer technology services, especially regarding the provision of computer-assisted instruction and associated study areas and the availability of resources from across the Internet and various research databases.

By the early 1990s, the hospital had embraced client-server computing. A typical arrangement at the departmental level, such as for biomedical engineering, might involve networking Intel architecture-based workstations and file servers using Novell NetWare.

In January 2026, the Mount Sinai Tisch Cancer Center launched PRISM, an artificial-intelligence platform developed by Triomics that analyzes electronic health records to identify patients who may qualify for cancer clinical trials across the health system.

== Rankings and recognition ==
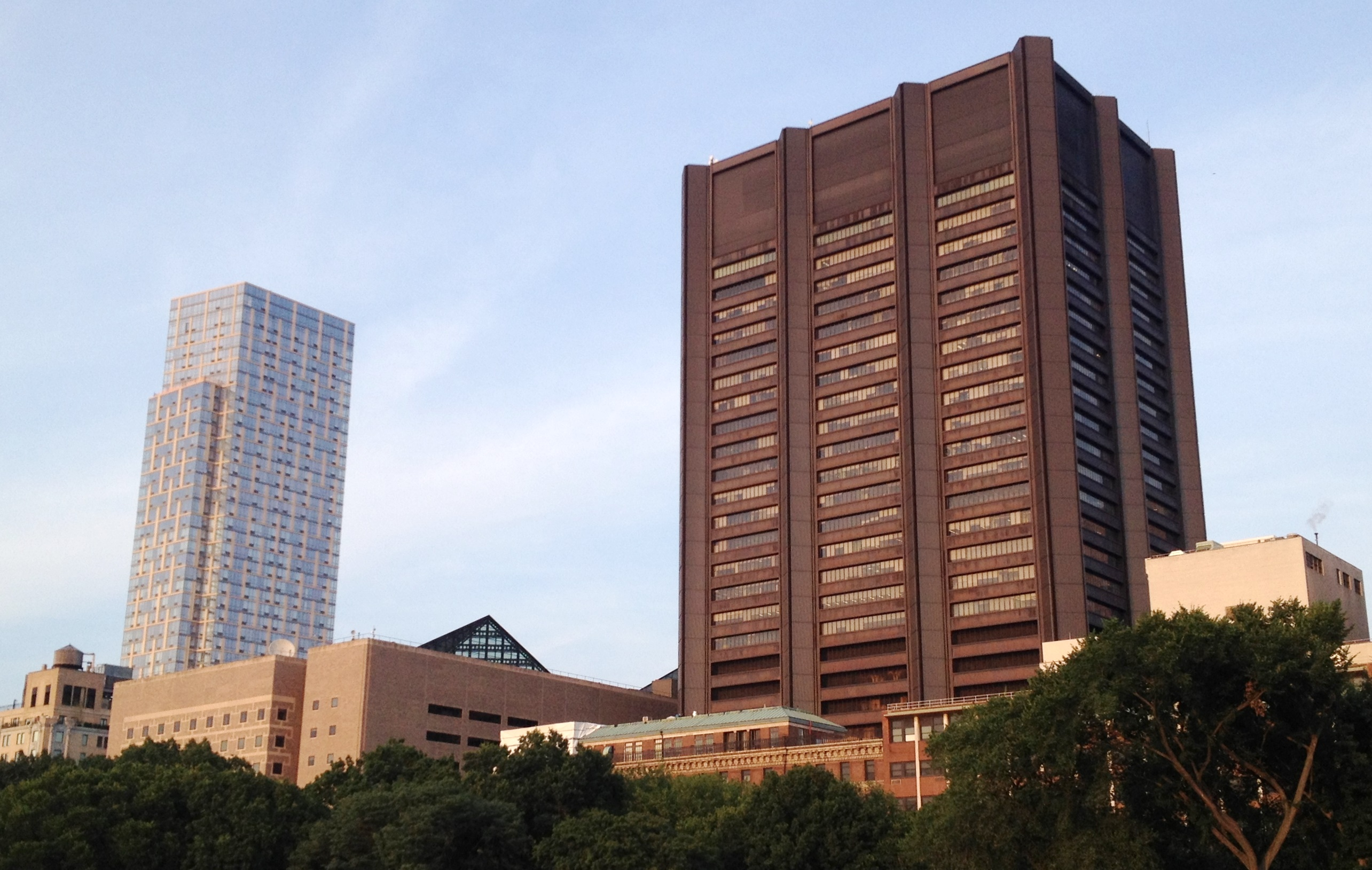
Buildings of Mount Sinai as seen from Central Park, 2012

In the 2026 Newsweek/Statista World's Best Hospitals ranking, The Mount Sinai Hospital was ranked 22nd worldwide, seventh in the United States, and first in New York City and New York state.

For 2025–2026, The Mount Sinai Hospital was included on the U.S. News & World Report Best Hospitals Honor Roll, with several specialties ranked among the top 20 nationally and 22 procedures and conditions rated as high performing.

U.S. News & World Report rankings for The Mount Sinai Hospital
Specialty	U.S. rank
Cancer	6
Cardiology, Heart & Vascular Surgery	2
Diabetes & Endocrinology	19
Ear, Nose & Throat	35
Gastroenterology & GI Surgery	5
Geriatrics	3
Neurology & Neurosurgery	11
Obstetrics & Gynecology	17
Orthopedics	14
Pulmonology & Lung Surgery	21
Rehabilitation	21
Urology	6

== Notable individuals ==
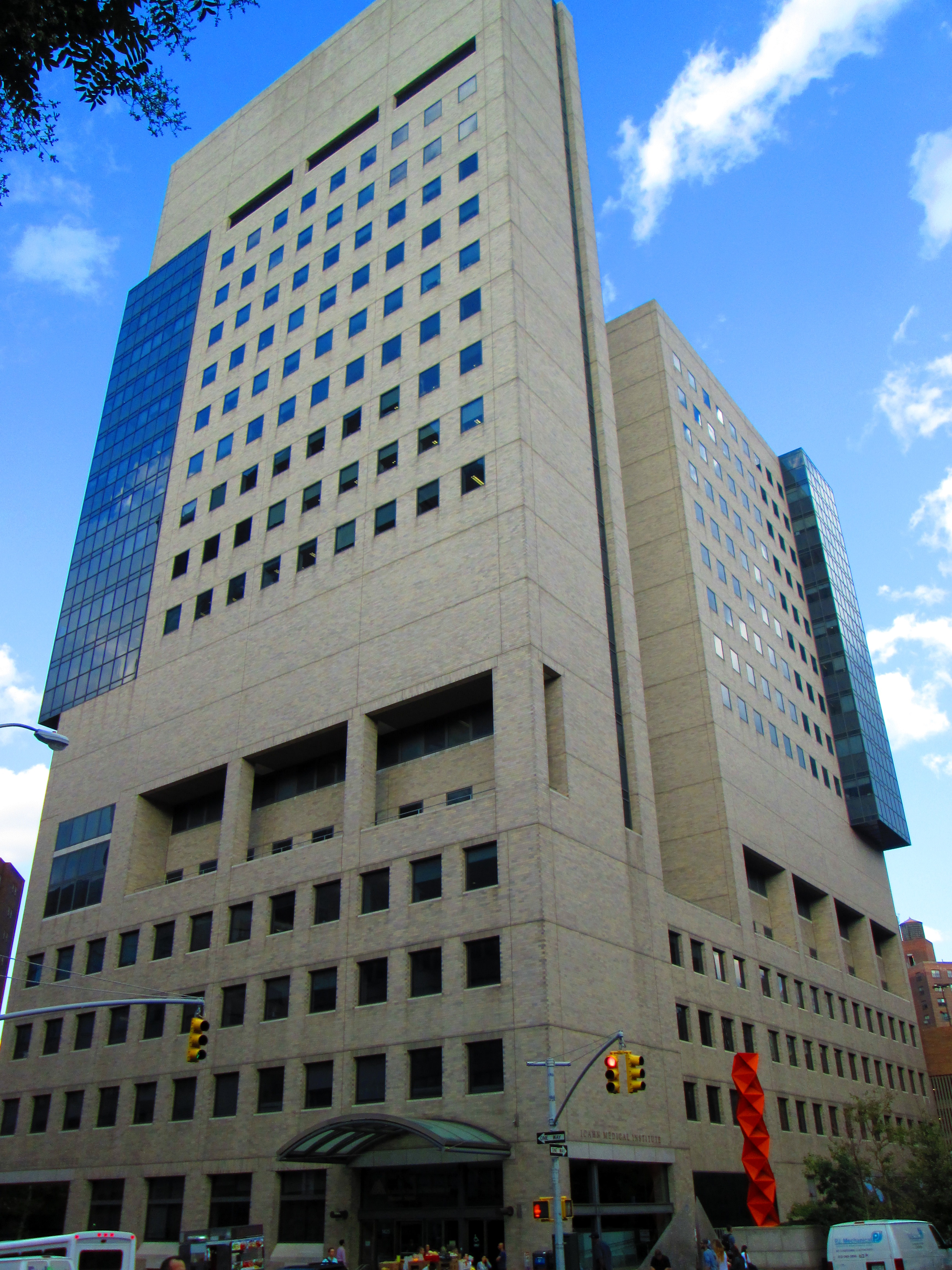
The Icahn Medical Institute at 1425 Madison Avenue, built in 1997 and named for its benefactor in 2004

=== Benefactors ===
- early benefactors to the Jews' Hospital and Mount Sinai include Judah Touro and Abraham Kuhn
- the Guggenheim family, the Lehman family, and the Morgenthau family are prominent New York lineages that have been Mount Sinai benefactors
- Businessman and diplomat Walter Annenberg and his siblings contributed to the construction of the Annenberg Building, which was named for their mother.
- Leon Black donated $10 million in 2005 to create the Black Family Stem Cell Institute.
- Emily and Len Blavatnik made a $10 million gift in 2018 to establish The Blavatnik Family Women's Health Research Institute at the Icahn School of Medicine at Mount Sinai and The Blavatnik Family – Chelsea Medical Center at Mount Sinai.
- Carl Icahn donated $25 million in 2004 for medical research, after which a building was named for him, and pledged an additional $200 million in 2012, after which the medical school was renamed for him as well as a genomics institute.
- Frederick Klingenstein, former head of Wertheim & Co., and wife Sharon Klingenstein donated $75 million in 1999 to the medical school, the largest single gift in the history of the school at the time, to establish an institute for scientific research and create a scholarship fund.
- Henry Kravis and wife Marie-Josée Kravis donated $15 million to establish the "Center for Cardiovascular Health" as well as funding a professorship.
- Samuel A. Lewis, NYC political leader and philanthropist who served for 21 years (1852–1873) as the first director, then honorary secretary, and finally chairman of the executive committee.
- Hermann Merkin gave $2 million in dedication of the kosher kitchen at the hospital.
- Derald Ruttenberg donated $7 million in 1986 to establish the Ruttenberg Cancer Center and later contributed an additional $8 million.
- Martha Stewart donated $5 million in 2007 to establish the Martha Stewart Center for Living.
- James S. Tisch and Merryl H. Tisch donated $40 million in 2008 to establish The Tisch Cancer Institute. An additional gift of $60 million was made in 2021 to establish the Mount Sinai Tisch Cancer Center and fund construction of the Mount Sinai Tisch Cancer Hospital.

=== Physicians and researchers ===
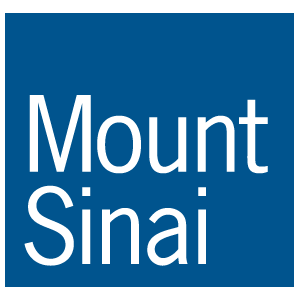
Mount Sinai's logo prior to 2012

- Jacob M. Appel (born 1973), bioethicist and liberal commentator
- Mark Blumenthal (1831–1921), resident and attending physician of Mount Sinai Hospital from 1854 to 1859
- Deepak L. Bhatt, first director of the Mount Sinai Fuster Heart Hospital
- Burrill Bernard Crohn (1884–1983), gastroenterologist who was one of the physicians who described Crohn's disease.
- Sander S. Florman, transplant surgeon and director of the Recanati/Miller Transplantation Institute.
- Valentín Fuster (born 1943), cardiologist, president of Mount Sinai Fuster Heart Hospital, and physician-in-chief of The Mount Sinai Hospital.
- Eric M. Genden, head-and-neck surgeon who led the team that performed the first successful human tracheal transplant.
- Irving B. Goldman (1898–1975), first president of the American Academy of Facial Plastic and Reconstructive Surgery, 1964.
- Jonathan L. Halperin (born 1949), director of Clinical Cardiology in the Zena and Michael A. Wierner Cardiovascular Institute.
- Michael Heidelberger (1888–1991), immunochemist who headed Mount Sinai's chemical laboratory in 1927.
- Abraham Jacobi (1830–1919), pediatrician and president of the American Medical Association, widely regarded as the father of American pediatrics.
- Eimear Kenny, known for novel approaches to computational genomics that examine human genetic variation and its link to disease, thereby laying the groundwork for integrating AI and genomics into routine clinical care.
- I. Michael Leitman (born 1959), American surgeon and medical educator.
- Blair Lewis (born 1956), gastroenterologist who helped develop the American Gastroenterological Association's position statement on occult and obscure gastrointestinal bleeding.
- Helen S. Mayberg (born 1956), neurologist known for research on brain circuits and deep-brain stimulation for depression and founding director of Mount Sinai's Center for Advanced Circuit Therapeutics.
- John Puskas, performed the first totally thoracoscopic bilateral pulmonary vein isolation procedure.
- David L. Reich, academic anesthesiologist, president and chief operating officer of Mount Sinai, chair of the department of anesthesiology, Horace W. Goldsmith Professor of Anesthesiology.
- Isidor Clinton Rubin (1883–1958), gynecologist and infertility specialist who developed the Rubin test.
- Bernard Sachs (1858–1944), neurologist associated with the description of Tay–Sachs disease.
- Jonas Salk (1914–1995), developer of the first successful polio vaccine, who began his medical career at Mount Sinai.
- Milton Sapirstein (1914–1996), clinical psychiatrist. Sought "to mesh the advances being made in neurobiology in the 1940s with psychoanalytic concepts."
- Samin Sharma (born 1955), interventional cardiologist, co-founder of the Eternal Heart Care Centre and Research Institute, Jaipur, and director, Dr. Samin K. Sharma Family Foundation Cardiac Catheterization Laboratory.
- Larry J. Siever (1947–2021), psychiatrist known for his work in studying personality disorders.

== Legal cases and controversies ==
In 2007, New York's Board for Professional Medical Conduct indefinitely suspended the medical license of Jack M. Gorman, a former chair of psychiatry at Mount Sinai, after he admitted inappropriate sexual contact with a patient.

In 2017, former Mount Sinai emergency physician David H. Newman was sentenced to two years in prison for sexually abusing four patients in the hospital's emergency department between 2015 and 2016.

Several physicians who had been affiliated with Mount Sinai were convicted in a federal kickback scheme involving prescriptions for the fentanyl spray Subsys. Alexandru Burducea was sentenced to 57 months in prison in 2020, Dialecti Voudouris was sentenced to time served, and Gordon Freedman received a 121-month sentence for the bribery offenses in 2021.

== See also ==
- Mount Sinai Health System
