= Genden =

Genden is a surname. Notable people with the surname include:

- Eric M. Genden, American otolaryngologist
- Peljidiin Genden (1892–1937), prominent political leader of the Mongolian People's Republic

== See also ==
- Labrang Monastery in Mongolia, formally Genden Shédrup Dargyé Trashi Gyésu khyilwé Ling
- Gendün
