= Giuseppe Sanarelli =

Italian bacteriologist (1865–1940)

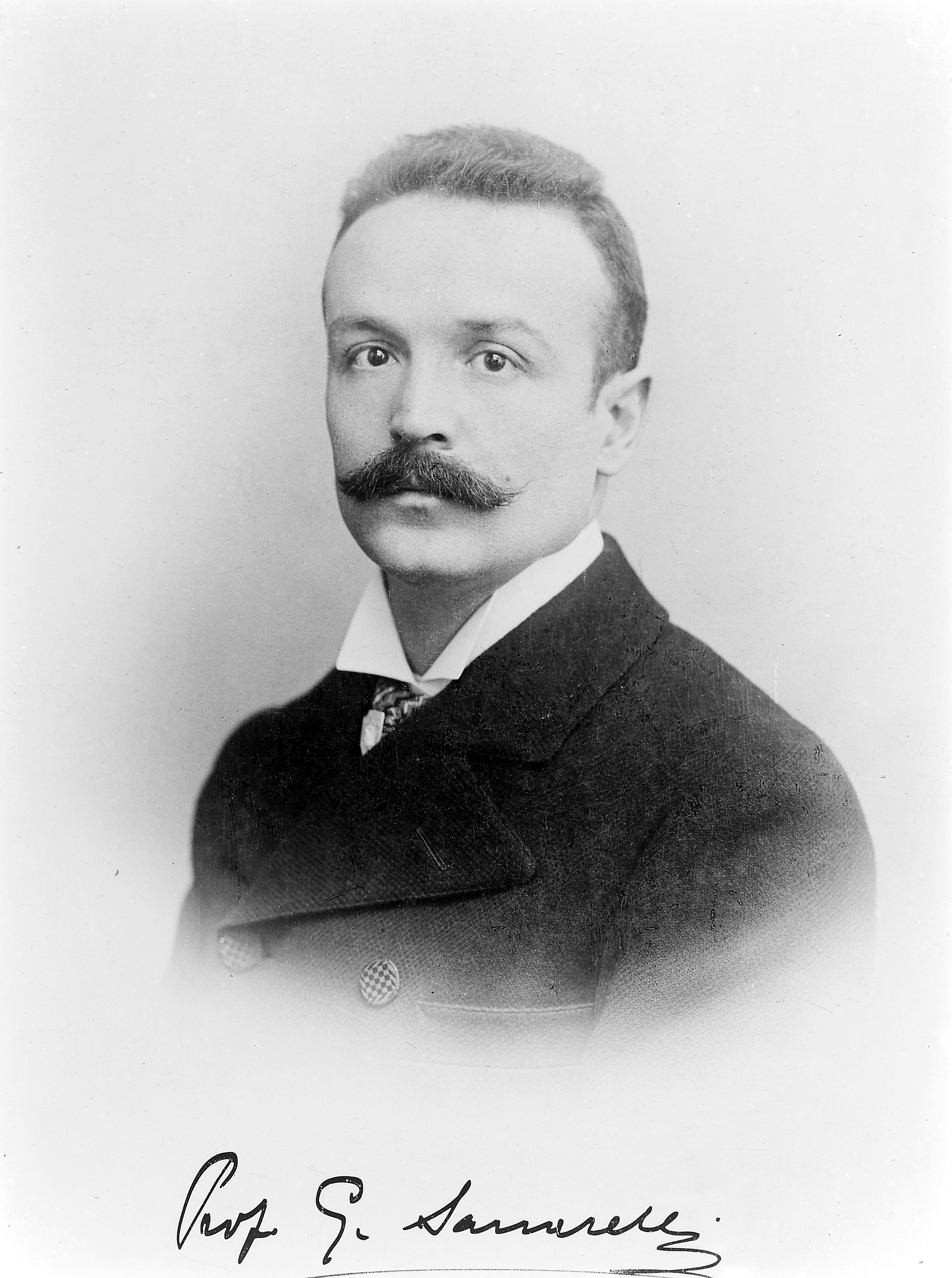

Giuseppe Sanarelli (24 September 1865 – 6 April 1940) was an Italian bacteriologist who incorrectly identified the cause of yellow fever as a bacterium. It was however found later by Walter Reed that the bacterium Bacillus icterioides was a secondary infection. In 1897 he triggered the first major public debate on medical ethics when he injected yellow fever bacteria into five patients without consent, three of whom died. He also served as a senator of the Kingdom of Italy from 1920 to 1940.

== Life and work ==
Sanarelli was born at Monte San Savino, Arezzo to Guglielmo and Veniglia Veltroni Poderetti. He studied medicine at the Universities of Siena and Pavia, working under Camillo Golgi. He then studied under Max Pettenkofer in Munich and in 1892 under Louis Pasteur, Emile Roux and Ilya Metchnikoff at Paris on cholera. He became a professor of pathology at Siena in 1889. In 1896 he moved to Montevideo, Uruguay to head a newly founded hygiene institution. His studies on pathogenesis led to the identification of rabbit myxomatosis, caused by a filterable agent that Benjamin Lipschütz named as Sanarellia cuniculi in 1927. In 1897, while studying yellow fever, he injected bacterial preparations into five patients without their consent. Three of them died, and this led to a major debate on medical ethics led mainly by William Osler. Sanarelli noted that bacteria injected intravenously could result in severe hemorrhage. Gregory Shwartzman found that just the toxins of bacteria could cause a similar reaction and since the reactions are similar, the term Sanarelli-Shwartzman phenomenon has been used. This is a known risk in certain forms of vaccines injected intravenously but more generic terms like Disseminated intravascular coagulation and cytokine storm have largely replaced the term.

Sanarelli married Maria Carmen Pons in Montevideo in 1898. In 1901, he became chair of hygiene at the University of Bologna. He served in the Ministry of Agriculture, Industry and Commerce from 1906 to 1909 dealing with issues related to colonialism, the colonies, and diseases. In 1915 he moved to the University of Rome and became a rector of the University in 1922. He became a senator to the Kingdom of Italy in 1920 and became politically active, opposing reforms and standing in defense of anti-fascist students in 1925 and later signed the manifesto of anti-fascist intellectuals. He however became less active and later limited himself to not joining the fascist party. He died in 1940 at Rome from appendicitis.
