= Jonathan L. Halperin =

American cardiologist

- Born: January 29, 1949; Boston, Massachusetts
- Education: Columbia University, Boston University
- Known for: stroke prevention research
- Scientific career
- Fields: cardiology
- Workplaces: The Mount Sinai Hospital

Jonathan L. Halperin (born January 29, 1949) is an American cardiologist and the author of Bypass (ISBN 0-89586-509-2), among the most comprehensive works on the subject of coronary artery bypass surgery. In addition, he is the Robert and Harriet Heilbrunn Professor of Medicine at the Mount Sinai School of Medicine as well as the director of clinical cardiology in the Zena and Michael A. Wierner Cardiovascular Institute at The Mount Sinai Medical Center, both in New York City. Halperin was the principal cardiologist responsible for both the design and execution of the multi-center Stroke Prevention in Atrial Fibrillation (SPAF) clinical trials, funded by the National Institutes of Health, which helped develop antithrombotic strategies to prevent stroke, and he subsequently directed the SPORTIF clinical trials, which evaluated the first oral direct thrombin inhibitor for prevention of stroke in patients with atrial fibrillation.

Halperin is the author of 3 books, 80 original peer reviewed reports, 38 chapters, 24 guidelines and position statements, 51 invited articles and 58 abstracts. He is listed among New York Magazine’s Best Doctors of 2009.

== Biography ==
Halperin was born in 1949 in Boston, Massachusetts. He earned his A.B. from Columbia University in 1971 and his M.D. from Boston University in 1975. He completed an internship in medicine (in 1976) and a residency in internal medicine (in 1977), both at University Hospital, Boston. He was a clinical and research fellow in peripheral vascular disease at the Evans Memorial Foundation for Clinical Research in Boston (1977–1978) and a fellow in cardiology at Boston City Hospital (1978–1980). He served academic appointments at Boston City Hospital, St. Elizabeth's Hospital in Brighton, Massachusetts, Boston University School of Medicine and the American Heart Association. In 1980, Halperin was appointed to The Mount Sinai School of Medicine as an Assistant Professor of Medicine. In 1993, he was named the Robert and Harriet Heilbrunn Professor of Medicine.

Halperin is a fellow of the American College of Cardiology, the American Heart Association, and the Councils on Circulation, Stroke and Cardiology of the American Heart Association. He is past president of the Society for Vascular Medicine.

Current federal appointments include the U.S Food and Drug Administration’s Cardiovascular and Renal Advisory Committee, and the Data Safety Monitoring Board for the Clinical Trial of Aspirin and Simvastatin in Pulmonary Arterial Hypertension for the National Institutes of Health.

Clinical investigation topics include congestive heart failure, Raynaud's disease and mitral valve disease.

== Honors and awards ==
Extramural honors and awards include:

- Master of the Society for Vascular Medicine, 2009
- The Heart of New York Award, 2005
- The Heart of New York Presidential Salute, 2002
- Howard B. Sprague Research Fellowship Award, 1979

== Books ==
- Halperin JL, Levine R: BYPASS: A Cardiologist Reveals What Every Patient Needs To Know. New York: Times Books – Random House, 1985 ISBN 0-8129-1157-1; Phoenix: The Body Press – HP Books, 1987 ISBN 0-89586-509-2
- Gross PA, Halperin JL, Lipkin M, Marks JH, Rivlin RS, Wise TN, Grzelka C: Managing Your Health: Strategies for Lifelong Good Health. Yonkers, NY: Consumer Reports Books, 1991. ISBN 0-89043-438-7
- Connolly SJ, Gore JL, Halperin JL. Aligning Clinical Practice with Evidence for Prevention of Thromboembolism in Atrial Fibrillation. Institute for Continuing Healthcare Education, 2002.

== Publications ==
Partial list:

- Lubitz, Steven A.; Scott, Stuart A.; Rothlauf, Elizabeth B.; Agarwal, Arun; Peter, Inga; Doheny, Dana; Van Der Zee, Sarina; Jaremko, Malgorzata; et al. (May 2010). "Comparative performance of gene-based warfarin dosing algorithms in a multiethnic population". Journal of Thrombosis and Haemostasis. 8 (5): 1018–26. doi:10.1111/j.1538-7836.2010.03792.x. PMC 4441275. PMID 20128861.
- Viles-Gonzalez, J. F.; Halperin, J. L. (October 2009). "Everything counts in large amounts: device-detected atrial high-rate arrhythmias". Circulation: Arrhythmia and Electrophysiology. 2 (5): 471–3. doi:10.1161/CIRCEP.109.909101. PMID 19843913.
- Hart, RG; Halperin, JL (September 2009). "Do current guidelines result in overuse of warfarin anticoagulation in patients with atrial fibrillation?". Annals of Internal Medicine. 151 (5): 355–6. doi:10.7326/0003-4819-151-5-200909010-00012. PMID 19721024. S2CID 19541531.
- Ip, John; Waldo, Albert L.; Lip, Gregory Y.H.; Rothwell, Peter M.; Martin, David T.; Bersohn, Malcolm M.; Choucair, Wassim K.; Akar, Joseph G.; et al. (September 2009). "Multicenter randomized study of anticoagulation guided by remote rhythm monitoring in patients with implantable cardioverter-defibrillator and CRT-D devices: Rationale, design, and clinical characteristics of the initially enrolled cohort The IMPACT study". American Heart Journal. 158 (3): 364–370.e1. doi:10.1016/j.ahj.2009.07.002. PMID 19699858.
- Scott, Stuart A; Jaremko, Malgorzata; Lubitz, Steven A; Kornreich, Ruth; Halperin, Jonathan L; Desnick, Robert J (August 2009). "CYP2C9*8 is prevalent among African-Americans: implications for pharmacogenetic dosing". Pharmacogenomics. 10 (8): 1243–55. doi:10.2217/pgs.09.71. PMC 2737687. PMID 19663669.
- Halperin, Jonathan L (August 2009). "What can ongoing clinical trials of anticoagulants demonstrate?". Journal of Cardiovascular Medicine. 10 (8): 610–5. doi:10.2459/JCM.0b013e32832e496b. PMID 19553827. S2CID 207382362.
- Warnes, Carole A.; Williams, Roberta G.; Bashore, Thomas M.; Child, John S.; Connolly, Heidi M.; Dearani, Joseph A.; Del Nido, Pedro; Fasules, James W.; et al. (December 2008). "ACC/AHA 2008 guidelines for the management of adults with congenital heart disease: a report of the American College of Cardiology/American Heart Association Task Force on Practice Guidelines (Writing Committee to Develop Guidelines on the Management of Adults With Congenital Heart Disease). Developed in Collaboration With the American Society of Echocardiography, Heart Rhythm Society, International Society for Adult Congenital Heart Disease, Society for Cardiovascular Angiography and Interventions, and Society of Thoracic Surgeons". Journal of the American College of Cardiology. 52 (23): e1–121. doi:10.1016/j.jacc.2008.10.001. PMID 19038677.
- Rubboli, A; Halperin, JL (November 2008). "Pro: 'Antithrombotic therapy with warfarin, aspirin and clopidogrel is the recommended regime in anticoagulated patients who present with an acute coronary syndrome and/or undergo percutaneous coronary interventions'". Thrombosis and Haemostasis. 100 (5): 752–3. doi:10.1160/th08-05-0334. PMID 18989515. S2CID 19333201.
- Singer, D. E.; Albers, G. W.; Dalen, J. E.; Fang, M. C.; Go, A. S.; Halperin, J. L.; Lip, G. Y. H.; Manning, W. J.; American College of Chest Physicians (June 2008). "Antithrombotic therapy in atrial fibrillation: American College of Chest Physicians Evidence-Based Clinical Practice Guidelines (8th Edition)". Chest. 133 (6 Suppl): 546S–592S. doi:10.1378/chest.08-0678. PMID 18574273. S2CID 26716327.
- Rubboli, Andrea; Halperin, Jonathan L.; Juhani Airaksinen, K. E.; Buerke, Michael; Eeckhout, Eric; Freedman, Saul B.; Gershlick, Anthony H.; Schlitt, Axel; et al. (2008). "Antithrombotic therapy in patients treated with oral anticoagulation undergoing coronary artery stenting. An expert consensus document with focus on atrial fibrillation". Annals of Medicine. 40 (6): 428–36. doi:10.1080/07853890802089786. PMID 18608125. S2CID 44445904.
- Sealove, B; Aledort, L; Stacy, C; Halperin, J (2008). "Recurrent orthostatic global amnesia in a patient with postoperative hyperfibrinogenemia". Journal of Stroke and Cerebrovascular Diseases. 17 (4): 241–3. doi:10.1016/j.jstrokecerebrovasdis.2008.01.012. PMID 18589346.
- Chaudhari PR; Abergel J; Warner RR; Zacks J; Love BA; Halperin JL; Adler E (August 2007). "Percutaneous closure of a patent foramen ovale in left-sided carcinoid heart disease". Nat Clin Pract Cardiovasc Med. 4 (8): 455–9. doi:10.1038/ncpcardio0944. PMID 17653118. S2CID 5574038.
- Halperin, Jonathan L (August 2008). "Thrombocytopenia during heparin therapy: a clinical conundrum". Nature Clinical Practice Cardiovascular Medicine. 5 (8): 440–1. doi:10.1038/ncpcardio1254. PMID 18560407. S2CID 32335541.
- Epstein, Andrew E.; Dimarco, John P.; Ellenbogen, Kenneth A.; Estes Iii, N.A. Mark; Freedman, Roger A.; Gettes, Leonard S.; Gillinov, A. Marc; Gregoratos, Gabriel; et al. (May 2008). "ACC/AHA/HRS 2008 Guidelines for Device-Based Therapy of Cardiac Rhythm Abnormalities: a report of the American College of Cardiology/American Heart Association Task Force on Practice Guidelines (Writing Committee to Revise the ACC/AHA/NASPE 2002 Guideline Update for Implantation of Cardiac Pacemakers and Antiarrhythmia Devices) developed in collaboration with the American Association for Thoracic Surgery and Society of Thoracic Surgeons". Journal of the American College of Cardiology. 51 (21): e1–62. doi:10.1016/j.jacc.2008.02.032. PMID 18498951.
- Epstein, A. E.; Dimarco, J. P.; Ellenbogen, K. A.; Estes, N.A. M.; Freedman, R. A.; Gettes, L. S.; Gillinov, A. M.; Gregoratos, G.; et al. (May 2008). "ACC/AHA/HRS 2008 Guidelines for Device-Based Therapy of Cardiac Rhythm Abnormalities: a report of the American College of Cardiology/American Heart Association Task Force on Practice Guidelines (Writing Committee to Revise the ACC/AHA/NASPE 2002 Guideline Update for Implantation of Cardiac Pacemakers and Antiarrhythmia Devices): developed in collaboration with the American Association for Thoracic Surgery and Society of Thoracic Surgeons". Circulation. 117 (21): e350–408. doi:10.1161/CIRCUALTIONAHA.108.189742. PMID 18483207.
- Goldbarg, Seth H; Halperin, Jonathan L (May 2008). "Aortic regurgitation: disease progression and management". Nature Clinical Practice Cardiovascular Medicine. 5 (5): 269–79. doi:10.1038/ncpcardio1179. PMID 18364707. S2CID 688994.
- Hirsh, Jack; Fuster, Valentin; Ansell, Jack; Halperin, Jonathan L; American Heart Association/American College of Cardiology Foundation (May 2003). "American Heart Association/American College of Cardiology Foundation guide to warfarin therapy". Journal of the American College of Cardiology. 41 (9): 1633–52. doi:10.1016/S0735-1097(03)00416-9. PMID 12742309.
