= Gendün =

Gendün (Tibetan: དགེ་འདུན) is a Tibetan personal name meaning "sangha". Gendün is its spelling in the Tournadre and THDL Simplified transcription systems; it is also written Dge-'dun in Wylie transliteration, Gêdün in Tibetan pinyin, Gendun, Gedun or Gedhun. Its pronunciation in the Lhasa dialect is [kẽ̀tyn].

Notable persons whose names include "Gendün" include:

- Gendun Drub, the 1st Dalai Lama
- Gendun Gyatso, the 2nd Dalai Lama
- Gedhun Choekyi Nyima, the 11th Panchen Lama according to Tibetan exile groups
- Gendun Chöphel, a monk, scholar, and political prisoner
- Gendun Rinpoche, a notable Karma Kagyu lama

== See also ==
- Genden (disambiguation)
