= Milton Sapirstein =

American physician

Milton R. Sapirstein (1914 – November 28, 1996) was a clinical psychiatrist who studied, lectured, and wrote about the connections between neurobiology and psychoanalytical concepts. He was emeritus clinical professor of psychiatry at Mount Sinai Medical Center in New York City for nearly 50 years.

== Works ==
- Emotional Security (1948)
- Paradoxes of Everyday Life (1953)
- Paradoxes in the Modern Family (1996)
