= David L. Reich =

American anesthesiologist

- Born: February 7, 1960 (age 66); Philadelphia, Pennsylvania, U.S.
- Education: Pennsylvania State University (BS); Jefferson Medical College (MD)
- Occupations: Anesthesiologist; President & Chief Operating Officer of The Mount Sinai Hospital; President of Mount Sinai Queens

David L. Reich (born February 7, 1960) is an American academic anesthesiologist, who has been President & Chief Operating Officer of The Mount Sinai Hospital, and President of Mount Sinai Queens (both part of the Mount Sinai Health System in New York City), since October 2013.

Reich is the Horace W. Goldsmith Professor of Anesthesiology at the Mount Sinai Medical Center, and from 2004 to 2014 he served as the Chair of the Department of Anesthesiology. In 2011, he received the Physician of the Year Award from Mount Sinai's nurses and nursing leadership. In 2011–12, he served as President of The Mount Sinai Hospital Medical Board. In 2014, he received the Jacobi Medallion from the Mount Sinai Alumni Association.

== Biography ==
=== Early life and education ===
Reich was born and grew up in Philadelphia, Pennsylvania, where he attended Central High School ('77). His parents, who live in Elkins Park, Pennsylvania, and were married for 60 years as of 2017, are Mary Lou Reich, a schoolteacher, and Pace Reich, an attorney who is a graduate of the University of Pennsylvania Law School and whose practice focuses on bankruptcy, corporate law, and commercial litigation. He has two siblings who are attorneys.

He graduated from Pennsylvania State University with a Bachelor of Science degree with highest distinction in 1980. Reich studied for two months as a medical student in 1980 in Jerusalem, Israel, at the Shaare Zedek Medical Center. He graduated from Jefferson Medical College (Five-Year Penn State-Jefferson Cooperative Program in Medicine) in 1982, becoming a doctor at 22 years of age. He completed two years of general surgery residency at Harbor–UCLA Medical Center in Torrance, California. He considered becoming a surgeon, but decided to focus on anesthesiology.

=== The Mount Sinai Hospital ===
Reich arrived at The Mount Sinai Hospital in 1984. There, he completed an anesthesiology residency and a fellowship in cardiothoracic anesthesia in 1987.

He was appointed co-director of Cardiothoracic Anesthesia in 1990. Reich was named Professor of Anesthesiology at Mount Sinai Medical Center in 2004, and is the Horace W. Goldsmith Professor of Anesthesiology. He served as the Chair of the Department of Anesthesiology at Mount Sinai Medical Center from 2004 to 2014. In 2011, he received the Physician of the Year Award from Mount Sinai's nurses and nursing leadership. In 2011–12, he served as President of The Mount Sinai Hospital Medical Board. In 2014, he received the Jacobi Medallion from the Mount Sinai Alumni Association; it is the highest honor bestowed by the association.

Reich was named Interim President of The Mount Sinai Hospital in January 2013. In October of the same year he was named President & Chief Operating Officer of The Mount Sinai Hospital, and President of Mount Sinai Queens (both part of the Mount Sinai Health System).

Reich announced in March 2020 that the hospital was converting its lobbies into extra patient rooms to "meet the growing volume of patients" with coronavirus.

=== Research, academia, and publishing ===
Reich was among the first to demonstrate the utility of electronic medical records for large-scale retrospective investigations demonstrating the association of intraoperative hemodynamic abnormalities with adverse postoperative outcomes.

His areas of research interest in anesthesiology include medical informatics, cardiac anesthesia, hemodynamic monitoring, outcome effects of intraoperative hemodynamics, deep hypothermic circulatory arrest, neurocognitive outcome following thoracic aortic surgery, and practice management.

Reich is associate editor of Kaplan’s Cardiac Anesthesia (Elsevier), which is in its seventh edition, and was formerly Editor-in-Chief of Seminars in Cardiothoracic and Vascular Anesthesia: The Journal of Perioperative Medicine. He is editor of the text Monitoring in Anesthesia and Perioperative Care (Cambridge University Press) and co-editor of the text Perioperative Transesophageal Echocardiography: A Companion to Kaplan's Cardiac Anesthesia (Elsevier), which are in their first editions.

=== Additional positions ===
- U.S. Content Director for the International Organization for Terminology in Anesthesia (IOTA) of the Anesthesia Patient Safety Foundation.
- Former Co-Chair of Blood Filtration Committee, American Association of Medical Instrumentation
- Member, Board of Directors, Society of Cardiovascular Anesthesiologists

=== Personal ===
Reich is Jewish. On November 24, 2002, The New York Times reported the commitment ceremony of Reich to Keith Loren Marran, stating that: "Keith Loren Marran Jr. and Dr. David Louis Reich are to celebrate their partnership today with a commitment ceremony at the Bloom Ballroom in Manhattan. Judge Paul G. Feinman of New York City Civil Court in Manhattan will officiate."

== Writings ==
Reich has published over 35 book chapters, 30 invited articles or editorials, and over 130 peer-reviewed articles.

Partial list:

- Reich DL (Mar 2010). "Central nervous system protection in cardiac surgery". Semin Cardiothorac Vasc Anesth. 14 (1): 32–7. doi:10.1177/1089253210362595. PMID 20472620. S2CID 2540202.
- Rhee AJ, Fischer GW, Reich DL (2010). "Manifestation of Aortic Root Abscess From Acute Bacterial Endocarditis". J Cardiothorac Vasc Anesth. 25 (1): 192–5. doi:10.1053/j.jvca.2010.02.002. PMID 20434926.
- Hiratzka LF, Bakris GL, Beckman JA, Bersin RM, Carr VF, Casey D Jr, Eagle KA, Hermann LK, Isselbacher EM, Kazerooni EA, Kouchoukos NT, Lytle BW, Milewicz DM, Reich DL, Sen S, Shinn JA, Svensson LG, Williams DM, Jacobs AK, Smith SC Jr, Anderson JL, Adams CD, Buller CE, Creager MA, Ettinger SM, Guyton RA, Halperin JL, Hunt SA, Krumholz HM, Kushner FG, Nishimura R, Page RL, Riegel B, Stevenson WG, Tarkington LG, Yancy CW, Lewin JC, May C, Bradfield L, Stewart MD, Keller S, Barrett EA, Welsh JM, Brown N, Whitman GR (Apr 2010). "2010 ACCF/AHA/AATS/ACR/ASA/SCA/SCAI/SIR/STS/SVM Guidelines for the Diagnosis and Management of Patients with Thoracic Aortic Disease". J Am Coll Cardiol. 55 (14): e27–129. doi:10.1016/j.jacc.2010.02.015. PMID 20359588.
- Scurlock C, Mincer JS, Reich DL (Apr 2010). "Invited commentary". Ann. Thorac. Surg. 89 (4): 1226. doi:10.1016/j.athoracsur.2010.01.021. PMID 20338339.
- Fischer GW, Benni PB, Lin HM, Satyapriya A, Afonso A, Di Luozzo G, Griepp RB, Reich DL (Jan 2010). "Mathematical model for describing cerebral oxygen desaturation in patients undergoing deep hypothermic circulatory arrest". Br J Anaesth. 104 (1): 59–66. doi:10.1093/bja/aep335. PMC 2791548. PMID 19933513.
- Levin MA, Lin HM, Castillo JG, Adams DH, Reich DL, Fischer GW. (Oct 2009). "Early on-cardiopulmonary bypass hypotension and other factors associated with vasoplegic syndrome". Circulation. 120 (17): 1664–71. doi:10.1161/CIRCULATIONAHA.108.814533. PMID 19822810.
- Mazzeffi M, Stone M, Stelzer P, Reich DL (2009). "Anticoagulation Management in a Patient With Antiphospholipid Antibodies Requiring Repeat Sternotomy". J Cardiothorac Vasc Anesth. 24 (3): 469–70. doi:10.1053/j.jvca.2009.04.017. PMID 19525127.
- Reich DL, Galati M (Apr 2009). "An American view American and European anesthesia reimbursement policies' effects on the adoption of novel techniques". J Cardiothorac Vasc Anesth. 23 (2): 140–1. doi:10.1053/j.jvca.2009.01.023. PMID 19324281.
- Reich DL, Galati M, Krol M, Bodian CA, Kahn RA (Dec 2008). "A mission-based productivity compensation model for an academic anesthesiology department". Anesth Analg. 107 (6): 1981–8. doi:10.1213/ane.0b013e31818ca31c. PMID 19020149. S2CID 29685447.
- Reich DL (Jun 2008). "Controlling data flow enhances anesthesiology's role in perioperative care". J Clin Monit Comput. 22 (3): 221–4. doi:10.1007/s10877-008-9122-3. PMID 19309793. S2CID 6042370.
