= Hyperimmune =

Hyperimmune may refer to:

- A hyperimmune set in computability theory
- Hyperimmunization, the presence of a larger-than-normal number of antibodies
- Hyperimmune globulin, a substance similar to Intravenous Immunoglobulin (IVIG)
