= Sander S. Florman =

American surgeon

- Education: Brandeis University, University of Louisville, Tulane University
- Scientific career
- Fields: transplant surgery
- Workplaces: The Mount Sinai Hospital

Sander S. Florman is an American transplant surgeon and Director of the Recanati/Miller Transplantation Institute at The Mount Sinai Hospital in New York City. He is a member of the American Society of Transplant Surgeons, the American Hepato-Pancreato-Biliary Association, the American Society of Transplantation and the American College of Surgeons.

Florman's work as the Director of the Transplant Institute at Tulane University in New Orleans earned him recognition as one of New Orleans Magazine's "People to Watch". He was twice named "Health Care Hero" by New Orleans CityBusiness (in 2007 and 2009) and was chosen as one of Gambit Weekly's "40 Under 40" in their "Best of New Orleans" class of 2004. He was recognized by Louisiana Life magazine as one of Louisiana's "Top Doctors" and "Best Doctors" in 2007–2009. Various awards include the Kremetz Resident Research Award, the ASTS Vanguard Prize and Tulane University's Promise in Research Award.

Florman is the author of nine book chapters and more than 75 publications.

== Biography ==
Florman graduated cum laude with honors from Brandeis University with a degree in philosophy. He received his medical degree from the University of Louisville School of Medicine in 1994. He did general surgery training at the Tulane University School of Medicine in New Orleans, also spending a year in the Liver Transplant Lab at The Mount Sinai Medical Center in New York City, where he investigated the effects of hypernatremia in brain death and ischemia/reperfusion injury in liver transplantation. He was recognized as Resident of the Year at Charity Hospital in 1998 and was named Administrative Chief Resident in 1999.

Florman completed a fellowship in multi-organ transplantation and hepatobiliary surgery at Mount Sinai, after which he returned to Tulane University as the Director of Transplantation. He was then named the Director of the Abdominal Transplant Institute and the Director of Transplantation at Children's Hospital of New Orleans.

He was named Director of Mount Sinai's Recanati/Miller Transplantation Institute in October 2009.

== Awards ==
- First Prize, New Orleans Surgical Research, Competition 1998
- Owl Club Most Valuable Intern Award and Owl Club Resident Teaching Award, 1995, 1998, 2000
- Charity Hospital Resident of the Year Award, 1998
- Krementz Resident Research Award, 1998
- Cerise Outstanding Surgery Resident Award, 2000
- Mims Gage Resident Teaching Award, 1998, 2000
- ASTA Vanguard Prize, 2005
- Tulane University Promise in Research Award, 2005

== Select publications ==
- Florman SS, Podkameni D, Wang L, Gordon RE, Curtiss S, Boros P, Miller CM. Hyperosmolarity associated with diabetes insipidus alters hepatocyte structure and function but not survival after orthotopic liver transplantation in rats. Transplantation. 15 January 1998;65(1):36–41. PMID 9448141
- Florman SS, Nichols RL. Hepatitis C: the real danger to surgeons(1). Curr Surg. 1 September 2000;57(5):414–420. PMID 11064061
- Florman S, Shneider B. Living-related liver transplantation in inherited metabolic liver disease: feasibility and cautions. J Pediatr Gastroenterol Nutr. 2001 Oct;33(4):520–1. PMID 11794242
- Kim-Schluger L, Florman SS, Schiano T, O'Rourke M, Gagliardi R, Drooker M, Emre S, Fishbein TM, Sheiner PA, Schwartz ME, Miller CM. Quality of life after lobectomy for adult liver transplantation. Transplantation. 27 May 2002;73(10):1593–7. PMID 12042645
- Fishbein TM, Florman S, Gondolesi G, Schiano T, LeLeiko N, Tschernia A, Kaufman S. Intestinal transplantation before and after the introduction of sirolimus. Transplantation. 27 May 2002;73(10):1538–42. PMID 12042637
- Florman SS, Fishbein TM, Schiano T, Letizia A, Fennelly E, DeSancho M. Multivisceral transplantation for portal hypertension and diffuse mesenteric thrombosis caused by protein C deficiency. Transplantation. 15 August 2002;74(3):406–7. PMID 12177622
- Florman S, Benchimol C, Lieberman K, Burrows L, Bromberg JS. Fulminant recurrence of atypical hemolytic uremic syndrome during a calcineurin inhibitor-free immunosuppression regimen. Pediatr Transplant. 2002 Aug;6(4):352–5. PMID 12234280
- Goldman J, Florman S, Varotti G, Gondolesi GE, Gerning A, Fishbein T, Kim L, Schwartz ME. Noninvasive preoperative evaluation of biliary anatomy in right-lobe living donors with mangafodipir trisodium-enhanced MR cholangiography. Transplant Proc. 2003 Jun;35(4):1421–2. PMID 12826176
- Florman S, Schiano T, Kim L, Maman D, Levay A, Gondolesi G, Fishbein T, Emre S, Schwartz M, Miller C, Sheiner P. The incidence and significance of late acute cellular rejection (>1000 days) after liver transplantation. Clin Transplant. 2004 Apr;18(2):152–5. PMID 15016129
- Paramesh AS, Roayaie S, Doan Y, Schwartz ME, Emre S, Fishbein T, Florman S, Gondolesi GE, Krieger N, Ames S, Bromberg JS, Akalin E. Post-liver transplant acute renal failure: factors predicting development of end-stage renal disease. Clin Transplant. 2004 Feb;18(1):94–9. PMID 15108777
- Gondolesi GE, Varotti G, Florman SS, Muñoz L, Fishbein TM, Emre SH, Schwartz ME, Miller C. Biliary complications in 96 consecutive right lobe living donor transplant recipients. Transplantation. 27 June 2004;77(12):1842–8. PMID 15223901
- Miller C, Florman S, Kim-Schluger L, Lento P, De La Garza J, Wu J, Xie B, Zhang W, Bottone E, Zhang D, Schwartz M. Fulminant and fatal gas gangrene of the stomach in a healthy live liver donor. Liver Transpl. 2004 Oct;10(10):1315–9. PMID 15376309
- Lipson EJ, Fiel MI, Florman SS, Korenblat KM. Patient and graft outcomes following liver transplantation for sarcoidosis. Clin Transplant. 2005 Aug;19(4):487–91. PMID 16008593
- Florman S, Miller CM. Live donor liver transplantation. Liver Transpl. 2006 Apr;12(4):499–510. Review. PMID 16555328
- Paramesh A, Zhang R, Yau CL, Balamuthusamy S, Shenava R, Killackey M, Alper B, Simon E, Slakey D, Florman S. Long-term outcome of single pediatric donor kidney transplants between African-American and non-African-American adults. Clin Nephrol. 2009 Jul;72(1):55–61. PMID 19640388
- Cooper M, Deering KL, Slakey DP, Harshaw Q, Arcona S, McCann EL, Rasetto FA, Florman SS. Comparing outcomes associated with dose manipulations of enteric-coated mycophenolate sodium versus mycophenolate mofetil in renal transplant recipients. Transplantation. 27 August 2009;88(4):514–20. PMID 19696634
- Paramesh A, Zhang R, Florman S, Yau CL, McGee J, Al-Abbas H, Amatya A, Killackey M, Slakey D. Laparoscopic procurement of single versus multiple artery kidney allografts: is long-term graft survival affected? Transplantation. 27 November 2009;88(10):1203–7. PMID 19935374
- Subramanian A, Sulkowski M, Barin B, Stablein D, Curry M, Nissen N, Dove L, Roland M, Florman S, Blumberg E, Stosor V, Jayaweera DT, Huprikar S, Fung J, Pruett T, Stock P, Ragni M. MELD Score Is an Important Predictor of Pretransplantation Mortality in HIV-Infected Liver Transplant Candidates. Gastroenterology. 30 September 2009. PMID 19800334
