= Eric M. Genden =

American physician

- Citizenship: United States
- Education: Columbia University, Mount Sinai School of Medicine Harvard University School of Public Health, Washington University, Barnes-Jewish Hospital in St. Louis.
- Occupation: Physician
- Medical career
- Profession: Surgeon, researcher
- Field: Neurosurgery, Otolaryngology
- Institutions: Icahn School of Medicine at Mount Sinai, Mount Sinai Health System
- Research: Cancer, immunology
- Notable works: First jaw transplant using the patient's jaw and bone marrow

Eric M. Genden is a United States head and neck cancer surgeon at the Icahn School of Medicine at Mount Sinai and Mount Sinai Health System in New York City. where he serves as the Isidore Friesner Professor and Chairman of Otolaryngology–Head and Neck Surgery and Professor of Neurosurgery and Immunology. According to his biography at Mount Sinai, Genden's professional titles also include Senior Associate Dean for Clinical Affairs, Executive Vice President of Ambulatory Surgery, and Director of the Head and Neck Institute at the Mount Sinai Health System.

== Education ==
Genden received his B.A. degree from Columbia University in 1987 and graduated from Mount Sinai School of Medicine in 1992 where he obtained his MD degree with Distinction in Research, and Harvard University School of Public Health with a Masters in Healthcare Management. His residency training at Washington University and Barnes-Jewish Hospital in St. Louis.

== Career ==
Genden's expertise is in thyroid, parathyroid surgery, head and neck cancer surgery, and airway reconstruction. Memberships include the New York Head and Neck Society, American Head and Neck Society, American Board of Facial Plastic and Reconstructive Surgery, and the American Broncho-Esophagological Association.

In 2006, Genden performed the first jaw transplant using the patient's jaw and bone marrow.

Genden has authored six textbooks on oncology and microvascular head and neck reconstruction. He published more than 200 peer-reviewed articles and co-authored a chapter about facial transplantation in for Facial Plastic Surgery Clinics of North America. He served as a co-investigator on more than 15 clinical trials.

He graduated from Brooks School in 1983 and received the Distinguished Brooksian Recipient Award in 2018, and is a contributing editor at the Journal of the American Medical Association's JAMAevidence.

== Research ==
A partial list of Genden's research areas include the debate between hemithyroidectomy or total thyroidectomy for well-differentiated stage T2 tumors; he has studied as well as written about palliative care for patients with head and neck cancer; and the role of human papillomavirus status in recurrent and metastatic squamous cell carcinoma of the head and neck.

== Publications ==
=== Books ===
- Genden, Eric M.; Varvares, Mark A (2008). Head and neck cancer : an evidence based team approach. New York, NY: Thieme. ISBN 978-1-58890-508-6.
- Genden, Eric M. (2006). Microvascular free tissue transfer : the anatomy and application of free flaps in contemporary head and neck reconstruction (1st ed.). Alexandria, VA: American Academy of Otolaryngology–Head and Neck Surgery Foundation. ISBN 1-56772-098-6.
- Genden, Eric M. (2012). Reconstruction of the head and neck : a defect-oriented approach. New York: Thieme. ISBN 978-1604065763.

=== Publications ===
- Eloy, JA; Carneiro, E; Vibhute, P; Genden, EM; Bederson, JB; Som, PM (September 2008). "A rare prevertebral ordinary lipoma presenting as obstructive sleep apnea: computed tomographic and magnetic resonance imaging findings". Arch. Otolaryngol. Head Neck Surg. 134: 1001–3. doi:10.1001/archotol.134.9.1001. PMID 18794447.
- Brandwein-Gensler, M; Teixeira, MS; Lewis, CM; et al. (February 2005). "Oral squamous cell carcinoma: histologic risk assessment, but not margin status, is strongly predictive of local disease-free and overall survival". Am. J. Surg. Pathol. 29: 167–78. PMID 15644773.
- Genden, EM; Rinaldo, A; Shaha, AR; et al. (March 2005). "Treatment considerations for head and neck cancer in the elderly". J Laryngol Otol. 119: 169–74. PMID 15845185.
- Genden, EM; Iskander, AJ; Bromberg, JS; Mayer, L (January 2003). "Orthotopic tracheal allografts undergo reepithelialization with recipient-derived epithelium". Arch. Otolaryngol. Head Neck Surg. 129: 118–23. PMID 12525206.
- Robbins, KT; Ferlito, A; Suárez, C; et al. (December 2004). "Is there a role for selective neck dissection after chemoradiation for head and neck cancer?". J. Am. Coll. Surg. 199: 913–6. doi:10.1016/j.jamcollsurg.2004.08.022. PMID 15555975.
- Genden, EM; Rinaldo, A; Shaha, AR; Bradley, PJ; Rhys-Evans, PH; Ferlito, A (March 2004). "Pharyngocutaneous fistula following laryngectomy". Acta Otolaryngol. 124: 117–20. PMID 15072411.
- Morris, L; Govindaraj, S; Genden, EM (2004). "Primary sphenoid sinus esthesioneuroblastoma". Am J Otolaryngol. 25: 350–3. PMID 15334400.
- Genden, EM; Rinaldo, A; Suárez, C; Wei, WI; Bradley, PJ; Ferlito, A (November 2004). "Complications of free flap transfers for head and neck reconstruction following cancer resection". Oral Oncol. 40: 979–84. doi:10.1016/j.oraloncology.2004.01.012. PMID 15509488.
- Govindaraj, S; Gordon, R; Genden, EM (October 2004). "Effect of fibrin matrix and vascular endothelial growth factor on reepithelialization of orthotopic murine tracheal transplants". Ann. Otol. Rhinol. Laryngol. 113: 797–804. PMID 15535142.
- Genden, EM; Wallace, DI; Okay, D; Urken, ML (September 2004). "Reconstruction of the hard palate using the radial forearm free flap: indications and outcomes". Head & Neck. 26: 808–14. doi:10.1002/hed.20026. PMID 15350027.
- Zur, KB; Genden, EM; Urken, ML (October 2004). "Sensory topography of the oral cavity and the impact of free flap reconstruction: a preliminary study". Head & Neck. 26: 884–9. doi:10.1002/hed.20088. PMID 15390196.
- Prediction of Postoperative Hypocalcemia after Thyroid Surgery using a Rapid Intraoperative Parathyroid Hormone Assay. Mandell DL, Genden EM, Mechanick JI, Bergman DA, Urken ML. Arch Otolaryngol Head Neck Surg, 2004
