= Icahn School of Medicine at Mount Sinai =

Private medical school in New York City

- Former name: Mount Sinai School of Medicine (1968–2012)
- Type: Private medical school
- Established: 1963; 63 years ago
- Parent institution: Mount Sinai Health System
- Dean: Eric J. Nestler, Anne and Joel Ehrenkranz Dean of the Icahn School of Medicine at Mount Sinai
- CEO, Mount Sinai Health System: Brendan Carr
- Academic staff: 6,900+ (2025–26)
- Students: 1,200+ (2025–26)
- Location: New York City, New York, United States; 40.789475°N 73.953781°W
- Campus: Urban
- Website: icahn.mssm.edu
- Location in New York City

The Icahn School of Medicine at Mount Sinai (ISMMS or Mount Sinai), formerly the Mount Sinai School of Medicine, is a private medical school in New York City, New York, United States. It is the sole academic partner of the Mount Sinai Health System, which operates seven hospital campuses in the New York metropolitan area, including The Mount Sinai Hospital and the New York Eye and Ear Infirmary. Eric J. Nestler is the Anne and Joel Ehrenkranz Dean of the school, and Brendan Carr is president and chief executive officer of the health system.

The school was proposed in 1958, chartered in 1963, and opened in 1968. It was renamed the Icahn School of Medicine at Mount Sinai in 2012 following a $200 million gift from businessman and philanthropist Carl Icahn.

Academic programs include MD, PhD, MD–PhD, and master's degrees. The campus is on Manhattan's Upper East Side, between Fifth and Madison Avenues, from East 98th to East 102nd streets.

== History ==
=== As Mount Sinai School of Medicine ===
The first official proposal to establish a medical school at Mount Sinai was made to the hospital's trustees in January 1958. The proposed institution combined a medical school supported by a teaching hospital with graduate programs in the biological and physical sciences and education in allied health fields.

This philosophy was defined by Hans Popper, Horace Hodes, Alexander Gutman, Paul Klemperer, George Baehr, Gustave L. Levy, and Alfred Stern, among others. Milton Steinbach was the school's first president.

Classes at Mount Sinai School of Medicine began in 1968 under an affiliation with the City University of New York, which granted the school's degrees.

The school expanded its programs and established new academic departments in subsequent decades. These included the Edith J. Baerwald Professorship of Community Medicine and Social Work in 1969; a Department of Neoplastic Diseases in 1973, described by the American Association for Cancer Research as the first of its kind at an American medical school; and the first academic department of geriatrics in the United States in 1982.

In the 1990s, the school expanded several research and outreach programs. Its Department of Emergency Medicine became operational in 1994. In 1998, it established the Center for Multicultural and Community Affairs to increase the representation of groups underrepresented in medicine and to support communities served by the school and hospital. With support from the Pew Charitable Trusts, the Department of Preventive Medicine established the Center for Children's Health and the Environment in 1999 to examine links between childhood illness and exposure to toxic pollutants.

Mount Sinai's degrees were granted by CUNY before 1999, when the school changed its university affiliation to New York University. The change followed the 1998 merger of the Mount Sinai and NYU medical centers into the Mount Sinai–NYU Medical Center and Health System. The institutions began dissolving their partnership in 2003.

In 2007, Mount Sinai Medical Center's boards of trustees approved termination of the academic affiliation, which formally ended in 2008. In 2010, the Middle States Commission on Higher Education accredited Mount Sinai as an independent degree-granting institution.

=== As Icahn School of Medicine ===
On November 14, 2012, the school announced that it would be renamed the Icahn School of Medicine at Mount Sinai following a $200 million gift from Carl Icahn.

== Academics ==
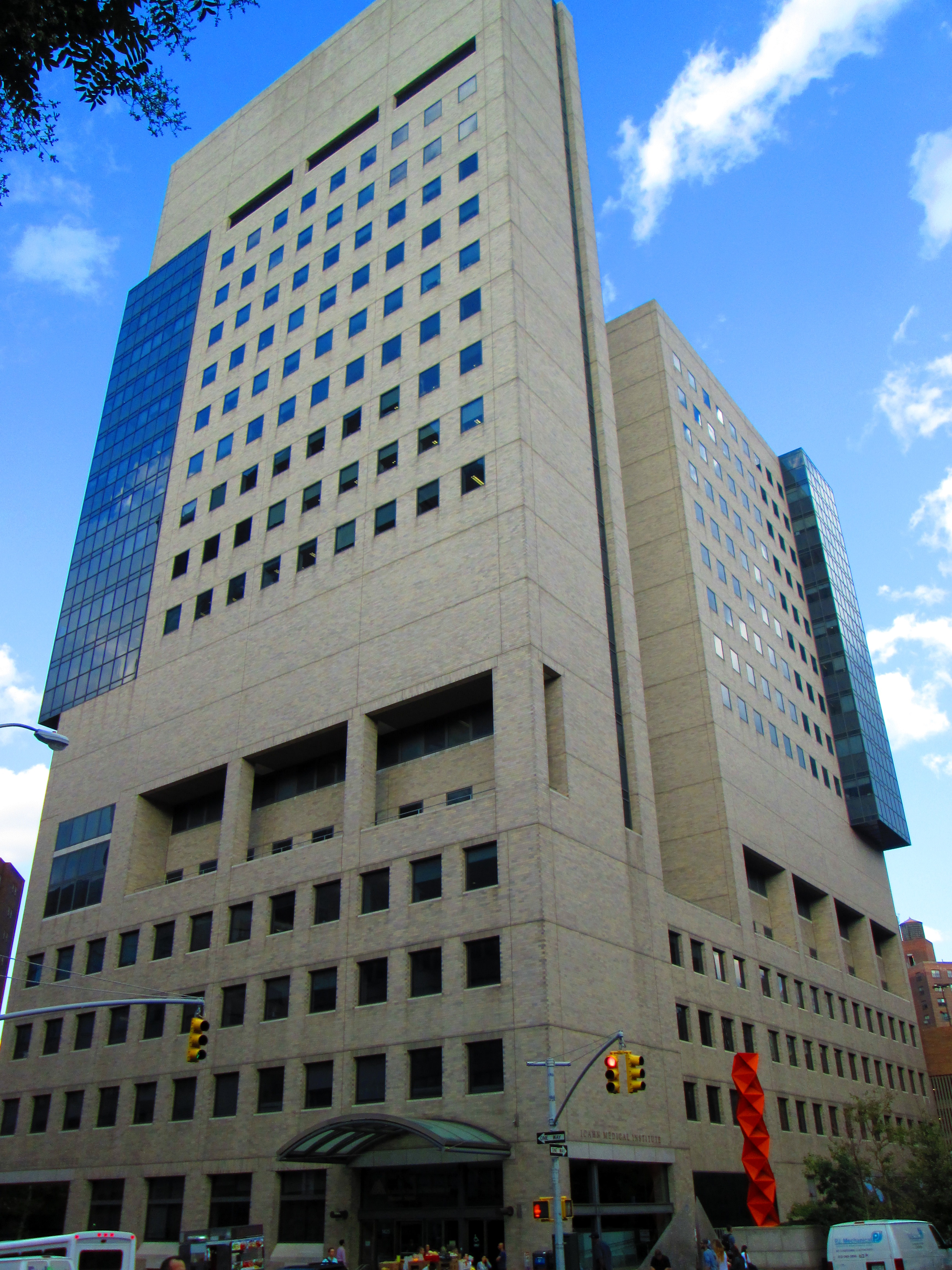
Icahn Medical Institute at ISMMS, built in 1997 and designed by Davis Brody Bond

The school offers MD and graduate programs through its Graduate School of Biomedical Sciences. Doctoral offerings include PhD programs in biomedical sciences, neuroscience, clinical research, and health sciences engineering, as well as a NIH-funded MD–PhD program. Master's programs include biomedical science, public health, clinical research, and health administration.

=== Admissions ===
Applicants to the MD program must hold a bachelor's degree and complete required coursework in biology, chemistry, physics, and related subjects. Applicants through the regular admissions route also submit MCAT scores. The school's FlexMed early-assurance program allows college sophomores from any major to apply without completing the traditional premedical science requirements or taking the MCAT.

=== Campus ===
The 18-story Icahn Medical Institute provides approximately 350,000 square feet of laboratory, treatment, and education space. The campus is on Manhattan's Upper East Side, between Fifth and Madison Avenues, from East 98th to East 102nd streets.

=== Partnerships and affiliations ===
In 2017, Children's Hospital of Philadelphia and Mount Sinai opened a fetal medicine program in New York and affiliated the Mount Sinai Children's Heart Center with CHOP's Cardiac Center. Mount Sinai also partnered with National Jewish Health to establish the Mount Sinai–National Jewish Health Respiratory Institute.

=== Research collaborations ===
In 2025, the Icahn School of Medicine, ARC Innovation at Israel's Sheba Medical Center, and NVIDIA announced a three-year collaboration to develop large language models for genomic research. The project combines genomic datasets and clinical expertise from Mount Sinai and Sheba with NVIDIA's computing infrastructure and software to study relationships among genetic variation, disease risk, and treatment response.

Also in 2025, the research organization BD² awarded a Mount Sinai team led by neuroscientist Ignacio Saez up to $4.5 million over three years to record brain activity and study changes in neural-network dynamics associated with shifts in bipolar mood states.

In 2025, the National Institutes of Health awarded the Albert Einstein College of Medicine a five-year, $10.8 million grant to expand the Einstein–Mount Sinai Diabetes Research Center into the New York Regional Diabetes Research Center, co-led by Einstein, the Icahn School of Medicine, and Weill Cornell Medicine. The expanded center includes more than 140 scientists and clinicians studying diabetes and related metabolic diseases.

=== COVID-19 response ===
The first confirmed case of COVID-19 in New York City was diagnosed by Mount Sinai emergency physician Angela Chen. During the initial New York City surge in March 2020, Mount Sinai faculty, residents, and fellows treated patients at Elmhurst Hospital Center, a major training site for the school.

== Rankings ==
The Mount Sinai Hospital, a teaching hospital of the school, was named to the 2025–26 U.S. News & World Report Honor Roll. Nine specialties were ranked among the top 20 nationally: cardiology and heart surgery (2), geriatrics (3), gastroenterology and gastrointestinal surgery (5), cancer (6), urology (6), neurology and neurosurgery (11), orthopedics (14), obstetrics and gynecology (tied at 17), and diabetes and endocrinology (19).

In fiscal year 2025, the school received $501.7 million in NIH funding and ranked 11th among U.S. medical schools by total NIH awards.

== Publications ==
The Annals of Global Health was founded at Mount Sinai in 1934 as the Mount Sinai Journal of Medicine. Levy Library Press publishes the Journal of Scientific Innovation in Medicine and The Practical Implementation of Nursing Science.

== Controversy ==
In April 2019, eight current and former employees of the school's Arnhold Institute for Global Health filed a federal lawsuit alleging sex, race, and age discrimination, a hostile work environment, retaliation, breaches of research ethics, and other misconduct. Mount Sinai denied the allegations. In April 2022, a federal court dismissed all claims brought by four of the plaintiffs while allowing some claims by other plaintiffs to continue. Four plaintiffs later brought state and city claims; the New York County Supreme Court dismissed several of those claims in July 2023, and the Appellate Division unanimously affirmed the dismissal of the appealed state and city human-rights claims in May 2024, however some of the claims of two plaintiffs were allowed and the case remains active. More than 150 medical students and over 400 employees and alum of the Icahn School of Medicine and the Mount Sinai Health System signed a letter asking Mount Sinai's trustees to investigate the allegations. The case catalyzed New York City legislation creating a Gender Equity Advisory Board for New York City’s hospitals.

== Notable people ==
=== Alumni ===
- Jacob M. Appel, novelist and short story author who earned an MPH from the Mount Sinai School of Medicine.
- Balamurali Ambati, who graduated from Mount Sinai in 1995 at age 17 and was recognized as the world's youngest physician.
- Jeffrey Scott Flier, former dean of Harvard Medical School.
- Scott L. Friedman, class of 1979, liver researcher and former president of the American Association for the Study of Liver Diseases.
- Rivka Galchen, author who earned her MD from Mount Sinai.
- Stuart Gitlow, Mount Sinai graduate and former president of the American Society of Addiction Medicine.
- Jeffrey P. Koplan, Mount Sinai graduate and former director of the Centers for Disease Control and Prevention.
- Herminia Palacio, former Deputy Mayor of New York City under Bill de Blasio and former president and CEO of the Guttmacher Institute.
- Charles Schleien, pediatrician and medical researcher.
- Benjamin (Benji) Ungar, 2006 NCAA men's épée champion and a graduate of the Icahn School of Medicine.

=== Faculty and former faculty ===
As of the 2025–26 academic year, 27 faculty members had been elected to the National Academy of Medicine or the National Academy of Sciences.

- Robert Neil Butler, physician, gerontologist, psychiatrist, Pulitzer Prize-winning author, first director of the National Institute on Aging, and founding chair of Mount Sinai's Department of Geriatrics and Adult Development.
- Arnold Martin Katz, cardiologist, author of Physiology of the Heart, and the first Philip J. and Harriet L. Goodhart Professor of Medicine at Mount Sinai.
- Stuart A. Aaronson, cancer biologist and the Jane B. and Jack R. Aron Professor of Neoplastic Diseases and founding chair of Oncological Sciences.
- Judith Aberg, infectious-disease researcher whose work has focused on HIV-related comorbidities, vaccine responses, and chronic inflammation.
- David H. Adams, co-creator of the Carpentier-McCarthy-Adams IMR ETlogix Ring and the Carpentier-Edwards Physio II degenerative annuloplasty ring.
- Joshua B. Bederson, neurosurgeon specializing in cerebrovascular and skull-base surgery.
- Solomon Berson, physician and scientist whose work with Rosalyn Yalow contributed to major advances in clinical biochemistry.
- Deepak L. Bhatt, interventional cardiologist and clinical researcher in cardiovascular prevention, intervention, and heart failure.
- Michael J. Bronson, orthopaedic surgeon and developer of the Vision Total Hip System.
- Michael L. Brodman, obstetrician-gynecologist specializing in female pelvic medicine and urogynecology.
- Steven J. Burakoff, cancer specialist, author of both Therapeutic Immunology (2001) and Graft-Vs.-Host Disease: Immunology, Pathophysiology, and Treatment (1990), and former director of Mount Sinai Hospital's Cancer Institute.
- Alain F. Carpentier, cardiac surgeon known for developing techniques used in modern mitral valve repair.
- Thomas C. Chalmers, known for his role in the development of the randomized controlled trial and meta-analysis in medical research.
- Dennis S. Charney, biological psychiatrist and former dean of the school whose research has focused on the neurobiology and treatment of mood and anxiety disorders.
- Kenneth L. Davis, psychiatrist and co-developer of the Alzheimer's Disease Assessment Scale.
- Charles DeLisi, former professor and chair of biomathematical sciences and professor of molecular biology who launched the Human Genome Project.
- Burton Drayer, president of Mount Sinai Hospital (2003–2008) and president of the Radiological Society of North America (RSNA).
- Marta Filizola, computational biophysicist whose research focuses on membrane proteins and G-protein-coupled receptors.
- Raja M. Flores, thoracic surgeon and researcher in video-assisted thoracic surgery for lung cancer.
- Valentín Fuster, cardiologist and former editor-in-chief of the Journal of the American College of Cardiology.
- Adolfo García-Sastre, leading virologist known for pioneering plasmid-based reverse-genetics methods for influenza, enabling detailed pathogenesis studies and improved vaccine design.
- Eric M. Genden, otolaryngologist who led the first human long-segment tracheal transplant.
- Isabelle M. Germano, neurosurgeon known for first-in-human applications of computer-assisted, image-guided neurosurgery.
- Alison Goate, neurogeneticist known for identifying mutations and risk genes associated with Alzheimer's disease and related dementias.
- Randall B. Griepp, professor of cardiothoracic surgery who collaborated with Norman Shumway in the development of the first successful heart transplant procedures in the U.S.
- Andrew C. Hecht, orthopaedic spine surgeon and consultant to professional sports teams including the New York Jets and New York Islanders.
- Yasmin Hurd, addiction neuroscientist focused on translational neurobiological signatures of opioid addiction and the developmental effects of cannabis.
- Horace Hodes, former Herbert H. Lehman Professor and chair of pediatrics.
- Ravi Iyengar, biochemist and systems biologist known for research on cell-signaling networks.
- Ethylin Wang Jabs, pediatrician and medical geneticist who identified the first human mutation in a homeobox-containing gene.
- Andy S. Jagoda, professor and chair of the Department of Emergency Medicine and editor or author of 13 books, including The Good Housekeeping Family First Aid Book and the textbook Neurologic Emergencies.
- René Kahn, neuropsychiatrist specializing in schizophrenia and neuroimaging and a Klingenstein Professor.
- Amy Kelley, geriatrician and palliative-care specialist who serves as deputy director of the National Institute on Aging.
- Paul J. Kenny, the Ward-Coleman Professor and chair of the Nash Family Department of Neuroscience and director of the Drug Discovery Institute at the Icahn School of Medicine at Mount Sinai.
- Annapoorna Kini, interventional cardiologist specializing in percutaneous coronary intervention and structural heart procedures.
- Philip J. Landrigan, pediatrician and public-health researcher in children's environmental health.
- Jeffrey Laitman, anatomist and physical anthropologist whose research examines the evolution of the human upper respiratory and vocal tracts.
- Mark G. Lebwohl, the Sol and Clara Kest Professor and chairman of the department of dermatology and author of Treatment of Skin Disease.
- I Michael Leitman, surgeon and medical educator who serves as the school's designated institutional official for graduate medical education.
- Ihor R. Lemischka, molecular biologist whose research focused on stem cell biology.
- Derek LeRoith, chief of the Division of Endocrinology, Diabetes and Bone Disease and director of the Metabolism Institute, and among the first to demonstrate the link between insulin-like growth factor-1 (IGF-1) and cancer.
- Blair Lewis, clinical professor of gastroenterology and instrumental in developing the International Conference of Capsule Endoscopy's consensus statement for clinical application of the capsule endoscopy.
- Barry A. Love, pediatric cardiologist specializing in congenital heart disease.
- Michael L. Marin, vascular surgeon and a pioneer of minimally invasive repair of abdominal aortic aneurysms.
- Helen Mayberg, psychiatrist/neurologist using deep brain stimulation (DBS) as a treatment approach for severe, treatment-resistant depression.
- Sean E. McCance, orthopaedic spine surgeon specializing in spinal deformity and degenerative spine conditions.
- Roxana Mehran, interventional cardiologist and clinical-trials researcher in cardiovascular disease.
- Diane E. Meier, geriatrician and a 2008 MacArthur Fellow.
- Miriam Merad, cancer immunologist awarded the 2025 Sjöberg Prize by the Royal Swedish Academy of Sciences for discoveries identifying immune-system targets for new cancer therapies.
- Marek Mlodzik, developmental biologist known for research on planar cell polarity and pattern formation.
- David Muller, physician and co-founder of the Mount Sinai Visiting Doctors Program.
- Eric J. Nestler, neuroscientist known for research on the molecular mechanisms of addiction and depression.
- Michael Palese, urologist specializing in robotic, laparoscopic, and endoscopic surgery for kidney and urinary-tract disease.
- Peter Palese, virologist known for developing genetic methods used to study influenza viruses.
- Giulio Maria Pasinetti, neurologist whose research examines neurodegenerative disease and mechanisms of neuroresilience.
- Sean P. Pinney, cardiologist specializing in advanced heart failure and heart transplantation.
- John Puskas, cardiac surgeon noted for performing the first totally thoracoscopic bilateral pulmonary vein isolation procedure and co-editor of State of the Art Surgical Coronary Revascularization, the first textbook solely devoted to coronary artery surgery.
- Kristjan T. Ragnarsson, physiatrist specializing in rehabilitation following spinal-cord and other central-nervous-system injuries.
- David L. Reich, anesthesiologist and hospital administrator who has served as president of The Mount Sinai Hospital and Mount Sinai Queens.
- Joy S. Reidenberg, comparative anatomist known for the television series Inside Nature's Giants.
- Elisa Rush Port, director and co-founder of the Dubin Breast Center at Mount Sinai Health System.
- Eric Schadt, mathematician and computational biologist whose work uses genomic and clinical data to model disease.
- Alan L. Schiller, professor and chair of the department of pathology and member of the board of directors of the National Space Biomedical Research Institute.
- Bernd Schröppel, transplant nephrologist and assistant professor of nephrology.
- Stuart C. Sealfon, identified the primary structure of the gonadotropin-releasing hormone receptor.
- Aryeh Shander, recognized in 1997 by Time magazine as one of America's "Heroes of Medicine".
- Joseph Sonnabend, physician, scientist and HIV/AIDS researcher, notable for pioneering community-based research, the propagation of safe sex to prevent infection, and an early and unconventional multifactorial model of AIDS.
- Filip Swirski, cardiovascular immunologist known for research on monocytes and inflammation in atherosclerosis.
- Samuel Waxman, oncologist and professor emeritus of medicine and oncological sciences.
- Denise Cai, neuroscientist and a key developer of open-source miniature microscopes for recording neural activity.
