= Sean P. Pinney =

American cardiologist

Sean Patrick Pinney is an American cardiologist and the Director of both the Advanced Heart Failure and Cardiac Transplant Program and the Pulmonary Hypertension Program at Mount Sinai Medical Center in New York City.

He is an Associate Professor of Cardiology at Mount Sinai School of Medicine, the author of over 20 publications in peer-reviewed medical journals and of multiple book chapters. He lectures frequently on the topic of cardiovascular disease.

== Biography ==
Pinney was born in St. Louis, Missouri, graduating from St. Louis Priory School in 1986; he received his undergraduate degree from Georgetown University in 1990 and graduated from Georgetown University School of Medicine in 1994. He completed a residency at Deaconess Hospital, in Boston, Massachusetts and was Chief Resident in Medicine at Beth Israel Deaconess Medical Center until 1998. He was a fellow in Congestive Heart Failure and Cardiac Transplants and Chief Fellow in Cardiovascular Medicine at Columbia Presbyterian Medical Center in New York.

His practice has a primary focus on the understanding and treatment of cardiac allograft vasculopathy, a condition affecting about half of all transplant recipients by their fifth year.

Pinney is a reviewer for the medical journals The Medical Letter, Mount Sinai Journal of Medicine, Nature Clinical Practice Cardiovascular Medicine, Transplantation and Transplant Immunology.

== Awards and honors ==
- 2005 – Best Medical Grand Rounds 2004-05, Mount Sinai Medical Center
- 2000 – Young Investigator Award, New York Cardiological Society/New York Chapter American College of Cardiology
- 2000 – Cardiology Fellowship Research Award, Columbia University
- 1998 – Ivy DeFriez Award, Beth Israel Deaconess Medical Center
- 1995 – James L. Tullis, M.D. Book Award, Deaconess Hospital
- 1994 – Pharmacology Research Award, Georgetown University

== Memberships ==
- Fellow, American College of Cardiology
- American Heart Association
- American Society of Transplantation
- Heart Failure Society of America
- International Society for Heart and Lung Transplantation
- Pulmonary Hypertension Association
- 1996-1998, American College of Physicians
- 1995-1998, Massachusetts Medical Society
- 1992-1998, American Medical Association

== Publications ==
- Nagarsheth, NP; Pinney, S; Bassily-Marcus, A; Anyanwu, A; Friedman, L; Beilin, Y (September 2008). "Successful placement of a right ventricular assist device for treatment of a presumed amniotic fluid embolism". Anesth. Analg. 107 (3): 962–4. doi:10.1213/ane.0b013e31817f10e8. PMID 18713914. S2CID 207129868.
- Filsoufi, F; Rahmanian, PB; Castillo, JG; Pinney, S; Broumand, SR; Adams, DH (November 2007). "Incidence, treatment strategies and outcome of deep sternal wound infection after orthotopic heart transplantation". J. Heart Lung Transplant. 26 (11): 1084–90. doi:10.1016/j.healun.2007.07.036. PMID 18022072.
- Mancini, DM; Pinney, S; Burkhoff, D; LaManca, J; Itescu, S; Burke, E; Edwards, N; Oz, M; Marks, AR (2003). "Use of rapamycin slows progression of cardiac transplantation vasculopathy". Circulation. 108 (1): 48–53. doi:10.1161/01.cir.0000070421.38604.2b. PMID 12742978.
- Pinney, SP; Chen, HJ; Liang, D; Wang, X; Schwartz, A; Rabbani, LE (October 2003). "Minocycline inhibits smooth muscle cell proliferation, migration and neointima formation after arterial injury". J. Cardiovasc. Pharmacol. 42 (4): 469–76. doi:10.1097/00005344-200310000-00003. PMID 14508231. S2CID 34108599.
- Lamour, JM; Hsu, DT; Quaegebeur, JM; et al. (August 2004). "Heart transplantation to a physiologic single lung in patients with congenital heart disease". J. Heart Lung Transplant. 23 (8): 948–53. doi:10.1016/j.healun.2004.06.012. PMID 15312824.
- Chen, JM; Davies, RR; Mital, SR; et al. (October 2004). "Trends and outcomes in transplantation for complex congenital heart disease: 1984 to 2004". Ann. Thorac. Surg. 78 (4): 1352–61, discussion 1352–61. doi:10.1016/j.athoracsur.2004.04.012. PMID 15464499.
- Pinney, SP; Cheema, FH; Hammond, K; Chen, JM; Edwards, NM; Mancini, D (January 2005). "Acceptable recipient outcomes with the use of hearts from donors with hepatitis-B core antibodies". J. Heart Lung Transplant. 24 (1): 34–7. doi:10.1016/j.healun.2003.09.036. PMID 15653376.
- Woollett, IF; Pinney, S; Magnano, AR (2005). "Balloon dilatation of coronary sinus spasm during placement of a biventricular pacing lead". Circulation. 111 (20): e304–5. doi:10.1161/circulationaha.104.471003. PMID 15911710.
- McKay, M; Pinney, S; Gorwara, S; Burke, EM; Sciacca, RR; Apfelbaum, M; Mancini, D; Itescu, S; Rabbani, LE. "Anti-HLA antibodies are associated with restenosis after percutaneous coronary intervention for cardiac allograft vasculopathy". Transplantation. 2005 (79): 1581–1587.
- Chen, JM; Russo, MJ; Hammond, KM; et al. (July 2005). "Alternate waiting list strategies for heart transplantation maximize donor organ utilization". Ann. Thorac. Surg. 80 (1): 224–8. doi:10.1016/j.athoracsur.2005.01.022. PMID 15975371.
- Salzberg, SP; Filsoufi, F; Anyanwu, A; von Harbou, K; Gass, A; Pinney, SP; Carpentier, A; Adams, DH (2005). "High-risk mitral valve surgery: perioperative hemodynamic optimization with nesiritide (BNP)". Ann Thorac Surg. 80 (2): 502–506. doi:10.1016/j.athoracsur.2005.02.041. PMID 16039193.
- Xydas, S; Rosen, RS; Pinney, S; et al. (November 2005). "Reduced myocardial blood flow during left ventricular assist device support: a possible cause of premature bypass graft closure". J. Heart Lung Transplant. 24 (11): 1976–9. doi:10.1016/j.healun.2005.03.003. PMID 16297808.
- Lubitz, SA; Baran, DA; Alwarshetty, MM; et al. (June 2006). "Long-term results of tacrolimus monotherapy in cardiac transplant recipients". J. Heart Lung Transplant. 25 (6): 699–706. doi:10.1016/j.healun.2006.02.003. PMID 16730576.
- Baran, DA; Alwarshetty, MM; Alvi, S; et al. (November 2006). "Is toxoplasmosis prophylaxis necessary in cardiac transplantation? Long-term follow-up at two transplant centers". J. Heart Lung Transplant. 25 (11): 1380–2. doi:10.1016/j.healun.2006.08.001. PMID 17097506.
- Lubitz, SA; Pinney, S; Wisnivesky, JP; Gass, A; Baran, DA (2007). "Statin therapy is associated with a reduced risk of chronic renal failure after cardiac transplantation". J Heart Lung Transplant. 26 (3): 264–272. doi:10.1016/j.healun.2006.12.003. PMID 17346629.
- Anyanwu, AC; Fischer, GW; Plotkina, I; Pinney, S; Adams, DH (October 2007). "Off-pump implant of the Jarvik 2000 ventricular assist device through median sternotomy". Ann. Thorac. Surg. 84 (4): 1405–7. doi:10.1016/j.athoracsur.2007.02.004. PMID 17889020.
- Pinney, SP; Wasserman, HS (2002). "Anterior myocardial infarction, acute aortic dissection and anomalous coronary artery". Journal of Interventional Cardiology. 15 (4): 293–296. doi:10.1111/j.1540-8183.2002.tb01106.x. PMID 12238425.
- Pinney, SP; Daly, PA (1999). "Parathyroid Cyst: an uncommon cause of a palpable neck mass and hypercalcemia.". West J Med. 170 (2): 118–120. PMC 1305454. PMID 10063401.
- Pinney, SP; Koller, BS; Franz, MR; Woosley, Raymond L.; Ph (1995). "Terfenadine increases the QT interval in isolated guinea pig heart". J Cardiovasc Pharmacol. 25 (1): 30–34. doi:10.1097/00005344-199501000-00006. PMID 7723350. S2CID 8904511.
