= Stuart C. Sealfon =

American neurologist

- Born: April 17, 1956; New York City, United States
- Education: Princeton University, Columbia University
- Scientific career
- Fields: neurology
- Workplaces: Mount Sinai Medical Center

Stuart C. Sealfon is an American neurologist who studies the mechanisms of both the therapeutic and adverse effects of drugs. He was an early adopter of the use of massively parallel qPCR and fluorescent in situ hybridization to characterize cell response state and his research accomplishments have included the identification of the primary structure of the gonadotropin-releasing hormone receptor, finding new signaling pathways activated by drugs for Parkinson's disease, elucidating the mechanism of action of hallucinogens and finding a new brain receptor complex implicated in schizophrenia as a novel target for antipsychotics.

Sealfon is the Glickenhaus Professor and Chairman of the Department of Neurology at The Mount Sinai School of Medicine in New York City. Sealfon also serves as director of Mount Sinai's Center for Translational Systems Biology. Additionally, he is both Professor of Neurobiology and Professor of Pharmacology and Systems Therapeutics.

Sealfon is the author of multiple book chapters and is the editor of Receptor Molecular Biology, Volume 25 (ISBN 0121852954). He has contributed to more than 100 original research articles and holds two patents.

== Biography ==
Sealfon was born in 1956 in New York City. He was raised in Rockaway. He graduated magna cum laude Phi Beta Kappa from Princeton University in 1978 and received the thesis award in comparative literature. He received his M.D. in 1982 from Columbia University College of Physicians and Surgeons, where he was selected to the Alpha Omega Alpha medical honor society. He completed an internship in medicine in 1983 and a residency in neurology in 1986 at Massachusetts General Hospital. After completing a fellowship in neuroscience at the Mount Sinai Medical Center, he was named assistant professor at the Mount Sinai School of Medicine in 1988.

Sealfon has served on the editorial boards of Endocrinology, Endocrine Journal, Molecular Endocrinology and the Mount Sinai Journal of Medicine and served as reviewing editor of Biochemical Journal. Additionally, he served on the advisory board of the Alanex Corporation.

Sealfon's work is supported by the National Institute on Drug Abuse, the National Institute of Diabetes and Digestive and Kidney Diseases and the National Institute of Allergy and Infectious Diseases. He directs the multi-institutional Program for Research on Immune Modeling and Experimentation (PRIME), an NIH-funded Modeling Immunity for the Biodefense Center. Through the Sealfon Laboratory and The Mount Sinai Medical Center, he oversees research on human hallucinogenic drugs of abuse, immune cell signaling, and gonadotrope signaling.

== Grants ==
A partial list of current grant support includes the following:

- GnRH Receptor Signaling Specificity, NIH, RO1 DK46943-14
- Mechanisms of Hallucinogens, NIH, PO1 DA12923-07
- Modeling Immunity for Biodefense, NO1 AI 50021

== Patents ==
- 1998, U.S. #5,750,366, Cloning and Expression of Gonadotropin Releasing Hormone Receptor
- 1999, U.S. #5,985,583, Applications of GnRH Receptor

== Publications ==
Partial list:

- Yuen T., Ruf F., Chu T., Sealfon S.C. (2009). "Microtranscriptome regulation by gonadotropin-releasing hormone". Mol Cell Endocrinol. 302 (1): 12–7. doi:10.1016/j.mce.2008.12.013. PMC 2683625. PMID 19356622.
- Sugar I.P., Sealfon S.C. (2009). "Model of autocrine/paracrine signaling in epithelial layer: geometrical regulation of intercellular communication". J Phys Chem B. 113 (31): 10946–56. doi:10.1021/jp903518x. PMID 19601596.
- Gonzalez-Maeso J., Sealfon S.C. (2009). "Psychedelics and schizophrenia". Trends Neurosci. 32 (4): 225–32. doi:10.1016/j.tins.2008.12.005. PMID 19269047. S2CID 35774080.
- Gonzalez-Maeso J., Ang R.L., Yuen T., Chan P., Weisstaub N.V., Lopez-Gimenez J.F., Zhou M., Okawa Y., Callado L.F., Milligan G., Gingrich J.A., Filizola M., Meana J.J., Sealfon S.C. (2008). "Identification of a serotonin/glutamate receptor complex implicated in psychosis". Nature. 452 (7183): 93–7. Bibcode:2008Natur.452...93G. doi:10.1038/nature06612. PMC 2743172. PMID 18297054.
- Borderia A.V., Hartmann B.M., Fernandez-Sesma A., Moran T.M., Sealfon S.C. (2008). "Antiviral-activated dendritic cells: a paracrine-induced response state". J Immunol. 181 (10): 6872–81. doi:10.4049/jimmunol.181.10.6872. PMC 4843808. PMID 18981106.
- Ruf F., Hayot F., Park M.J., Ge Y., Lin G., Roysam B., Sealfon S.C. (2007). "Noise propagation and scaling in regulation of gonadotrope biosynthesis". Biophys J. 93 (12): 4474–80. Bibcode:2007BpJ....93.4474R. doi:10.1529/biophysj.107.115170. PMC 2098712. PMID 17720728.
- Hu J., Sealfon S.C., Hayot F., Jayaprakash C., Kumar M., Pendleton A.C., Ganee A., Fernandez-Sesma A., Moran T.M., Wetmur J.G. (2007). "Chromosome-specific and noisy IFNB1 transcription in individual virus-infected human primary dendritic cells". Nucleic Acids Res. 35 (15): 5232–41. doi:10.1093/nar/gkm557. PMC 1976463. PMID 17675303.
- Grisotto MG, Garin A, Martin AP, Jensen KK, Chan P, Sealfon SC, Lira SA (2006). "The human herpesvirus 8 chemokine receptor vGPCR triggers autonomous proliferation of endothelial cells". J Clin Invest. 116 (5): 1264–1273. doi:10.1172/jci26666. PMC 1430356. PMID 16604194.
- Moriarty TM, Sealfon SC, Carty CJ, Roberts JL, Iyengar R, Landau EM (1989). "Coupling of exogenous receptors to phospholipase C in Xenopus oocytes through pertussis toxin sensitive and insensitive pathways". J. Biol. Chem. 264 (23): 13524–13530. doi:10.1016/S0021-9258(18)80028-X. PMID 2474532.
- Gonzalez-Maeso J., Weisstaub N.V., Zhou M., Chan P., Ivic L., Ang R., Lira A., Bradley-Moore M., Ge Y., Zhou Q., Sealfon S.C., Gingrich J.A. (2007). "Hallucinogens recruit specific cortical 5-HT(2A) receptor-mediated signaling pathways to affect behavior". Neuron. 53 (3): 439–52. doi:10.1016/j.neuron.2007.01.008. PMID 17270739.
- Ruf F., Park M.J., Hayot F., Lin G., Roysam B., Ge Y., Sealfon S.C. (2006). "Mixed analog/digital gonadotrope biosynthetic response to gonadotropin-releasing hormone". J Biol Chem. 281 (41): 30967–78. doi:10.1074/jbc.M606486200. PMID 16916798.
- Nair V.D., McNaught K.S., Gonzalez-Maeso J., Sealfon S.C., Olanow C.W. (2006). "p53 mediates nontranscriptional cell death in dopaminergic cells in response to proteasome inhibition". J Biol Chem. 281 (51): 39550–60. doi:10.1074/jbc.M603950200. PMID 17060322.
- Chan P., Yuen T., Ruf F., Gonzalez-Maeso J., Sealfon S.C. (2005). "Method for multiplex cellular detection of mRNAs using quantum dot fluorescent in situ hybridization". Nucleic Acids Res. 33 (18): e161. doi:10.1093/nar/gni162. PMC 1258180. PMID 16224100.
- Wurmbach E., Yuen T., Ebersole B.J., Sealfon S.C. (2001). "Gonadotropin-releasing hormone receptor-coupled gene network organization". J Biol Chem. 276 (50): 47195–201. doi:10.1074/jbc.M108716200. PMID 11581274.
- Mitchell R., McCulloch D., Lutz E., Johnson M., MacKenzie C., Fennell M., Fink G., Zhou W., Sealfon S.C. (1998). "Rhodopsin-family receptors associate with small G proteins to activate phospholipase D.". Nature. 392 (6674): 411–4. Bibcode:1998Natur.392..411M. doi:10.1038/32937. PMID 9537328. S2CID 4430333.
- Tsutsumi M., Zhou W., Millar R.P., Mellon P.L., Roberts J.L., Flanagan C.A., Dong K., Gillo B., Sealfon S.C. (1992). "Cloning and functional expression of a mouse gonadotropin-releasing hormone receptor". Mol Endocrinol. 6 (7): 1163–9. doi:10.1210/mend.6.7.1324422. PMID 1324422.
