= Randall B. Griepp =

American cardiothoracic surgeon (1940–2022)

- Born: March 11, 1940; Marshall, Minnesota, US
- Died: September 8, 2022 (aged 82); New York City, US
- Occupation: Cardiothoracic Surgeon
- Children: 1

Randall Bertram Griepp (March 11, 1940 – September 8, 2022) was an American cardiothoracic surgeon who collaborated with Norman Shumway in the development of the first successful heart transplant procedures in the U.S. He had an international reputation for contributions to the surgical treatment of aortic aneurysms and aortic dissection and in heart and lung transplantations. He received nearly $8 million in grants from the National Heart, Lung, and Blood Institute.

He was a Professor of Cardiothoracic Surgery at the Icahn School of Medicine at Mount Sinai in New York City.

== Life and career ==
Randall Griepp graduated from Oakland Technical High School and received a BS from California Institute of Technology. He earned his medical degree from Stanford University Medical School, then completed residencies at both Stanford Hospital and Bellevue Hospital Center. He also did a fellowship in cardiothoracic surgery at Stanford Hospital.

In 1985, Griepp succeeded Robert S. Litwak as Chief of the Division of Cardiothoracic Surgery at Mount Sinai Hospital. Under Griepp's direction, Cardiothoracic Surgery was made an independent department at both the Icahn School of Medicine at Mount Sinai and Mount Sinai Hospital, and Griepp was its first chairman. A heart and lung transplant program commenced in 1990.

Griepp stepped down as chairman in 2001 to pursue research and clinical interests, and was succeeded by David H. Adams.

Griepp died on September 8, 2022, aged 82.

== Awards ==
- Children's Heart Fund Precious Heart Award, 2003
- Distinguished Scientist Award, Bicuspid Aortic Foundation

== Publications ==
Partial list:

- Etz CD, Plestis KA, Kari FA; et al. (September 2008). "Staged repair of thoracic and thoracoabdominal aortic aneurysms using the elephant trunk technique: a consecutive series of 215 first stage and 120 complete repairs". Eur J Cardiothorac Surg. 34: 605–14, discussion 614–5. doi:10.1016/j.ejcts.2008.04.045. PMID 18555692.
- Etz CD, Homann TM, Silovitz D; et al. (October 2007). "Long-term survival after the Bentall procedure in 206 patients with bicuspid aortic valve". Ann. Thorac. Surg. 84: 1186–93, discussion 1193–4. doi:10.1016/j.athoracsur.2007.03.057. PMID 17888968.
- Etz CD, Homann TM, Rane N; et al. (June 2007). "Aortic root reconstruction with a bioprosthetic valved conduit: a consecutive series of 275 procedures". J. Thorac. Cardiovasc. Surg. 133: 1455–63. doi:10.1016/j.jtcvs.2007.01.058. PMID 17532939.
- Spielvogel D, Etz CD, Silovitz D, Lansman SL, Griepp RB (February 2007). "Aortic arch replacement with a trifurcated graft". Ann. Thorac. Surg. 83: S791–5, discussion S824–31. doi:10.1016/j.athoracsur.2006.11.015. PMID 17257928.
- Etz CD, Halstead JC, Spielvogel D; et al. (November 2006). "Thoracic and thoracoabdominal aneurysm repair: is reimplantation of spinal cord arteries a waste of time?". Ann. Thorac. Surg. 82: 1670–7. doi:10.1016/j.athoracsur.2006.05.029. PMID 17062225.
- Carroccio A, Spielvogel D, Ellozy SH; et al. (2005). "Aortic arch and descending thoracic aortic aneurysms: experience with stent grafting for second-stage "elephant trunk" repair". Vascular. 13: 5–10. PMID 15895668.
- Hagl C, Strauch JT, Spielvogel D; et al. (September 2003). "Is the Bentall procedure for ascending aorta or aortic valve replacement the best approach for long-term event-free survival?". Ann. Thorac. Surg. 76: 698–703, discussion 703. PMID 12963181.
- Griepp RB, Ergin MA, Galla JD; et al. (November 1996). "Looking for the artery of Adamkiewicz: a quest to minimize paraplegia after operations for aneurysms of the descending thoracic and thoracoabdominal aorta". J. Thorac. Cardiovasc. Surg. 112: 1202–13, discussion 1213–5. PMID 8911316.
- Griepp RB, Stinson EB, Bieber CP; et al. (August 1976). "Human heart transplantation: current status". Ann. Thorac. Surg. 22: 171–5. PMID 788661.
- Griepp RB, Stinson EB, Hollingsworth JF, Buehler D (December 1975). "Prosthetic replacement of the aortic arch". J. Thorac. Cardiovasc. Surg. 70: 1051–63. PMID 1186283.
