= Jessica Seinfeld =

American writer (born 1971)

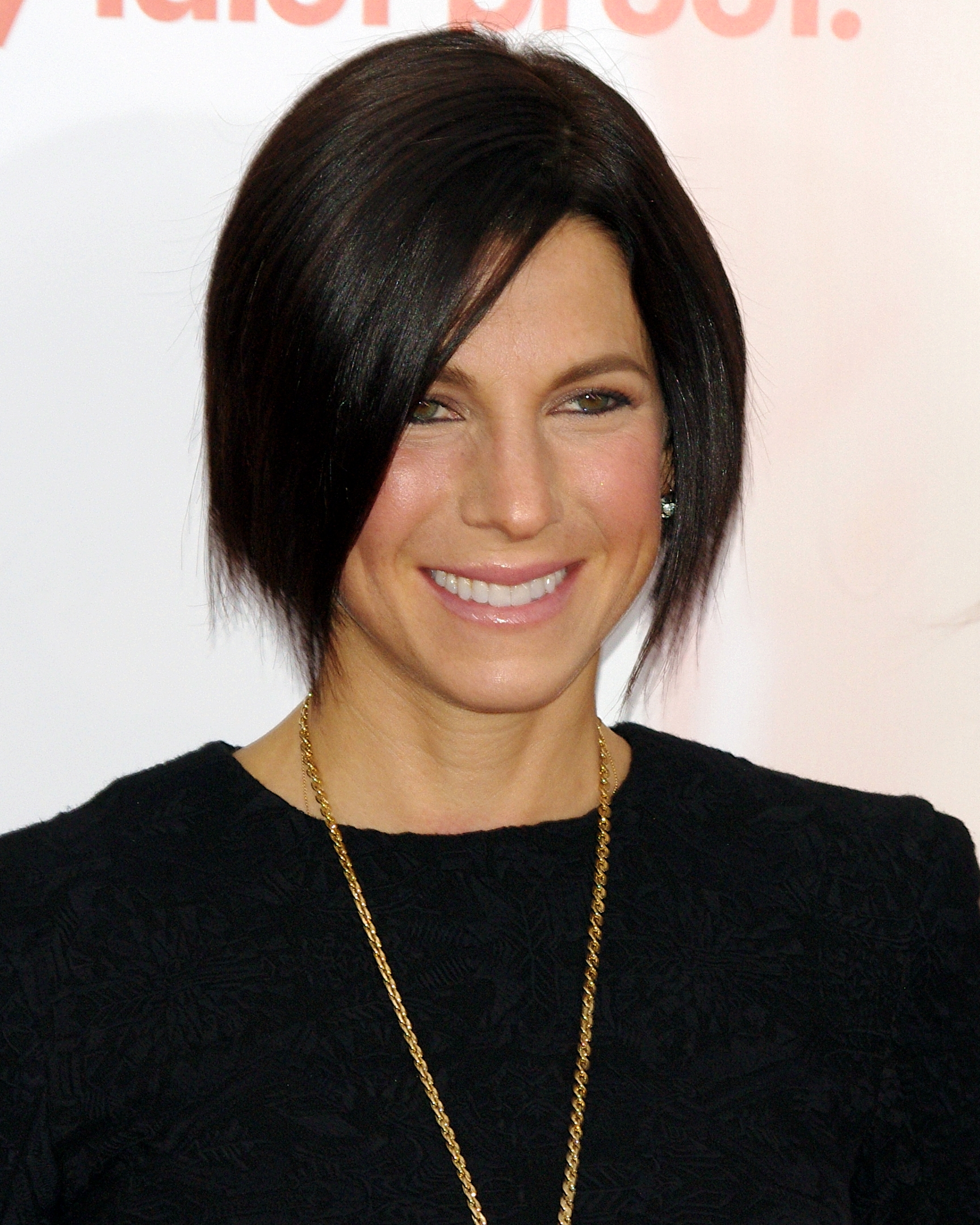
- Seinfeld at the 2012 premiere of What to Expect When You're Expecting in New York
- Born: Nina Danielle Sklar; September 12, 1971 (age 55); Oyster Bay, New York, U.S.
- Other name: Jessica Sklar
- Education: University of Vermont
- Occupations: Author, philanthropist
- Spouses: Eric Nederlander (m. 1998; div. 1998) Jerry Seinfeld (m. 1999)
- Children: 3
- Writing career
- Subject: Cookbooks/Vegan Cookbooks
- Notable works: Deceptively Delicious:Simple Secrets to Get Your Kids Eating Good Food; Double Delicious:Good, Simple Food for Busy, Complicated Lives; Vegan at Times
- Website: jessicaseinfeld.com

Jessica Seinfeld (/ˈsaɪnfɛld/; SYNE-feld, born Nina Danielle Sklar; September 12, 1971) is an American author and wife of comedian Jerry Seinfeld. She has released five cookbooks about preparing food for families, and is the founder of the GOOD+ Foundation (formerly Baby Buggy), a New York City-based charitable organization that provides essential items for families in need throughout New York City.

== Early life ==
Nina Sklar was born in Oyster Bay, New York, the middle child of three daughters, and grew up in a middle-class Jewish household in Burlington, Vermont. Her mother was a Victims Service Advocate for more than 50 years and an attendance officer at Hunt Middle School, while her father was a computer software engineer.

== Career ==
After graduating from the University of Vermont, Sklar worked in public relations for Golden Books Entertainment and Tommy Hilfiger.

=== Baby Buggy ===
She founded Baby Buggy in 2001 following the birth of her first child. She started with a donation drive, whereby she asked people for their used baby supplies after realizing that her first child's products, no longer of use to her own family, could be used by others. As of May 2013, Baby Buggy has donated over six million items to New York families since the organization was established.

Baby Buggy works with a network of over 50 community-based organizations (CBOs) that are carefully selected. Some of the organizations that have partnered with Baby Buggy include organizations working with victims of domestic violence such as Safe Horizon and New York Asian Women's Center, now known as Womankind; multi-service sites including Single Stop East Harlem and Lenox Hill Neighborhood House; prenatal and NICU units at hospitals such as Woodhull and NY Presbyterian; immigrant and refugee-serving organizations including the International Rescue Committee; and parenting programs, such as the Nurse-Family Partnership program and the Harlem Children's Zone's Baby College.

About $2 Million of Baby Buggy's budget is made up of in-kind product donations from individuals and corporations. Financial support for the organization comes from its board of directors, the friends of Baby Buggy group, private individuals, corporations and foundations. As of 2008, 88 cents of every dollar received by Baby Buggy went straight to programs. In 2013, Baby Buggy received its fourth Four Star rating from Charity Navigator. The charity is also an Accredited Charity of the Better Business Bureau.

In July 2010, Baby Buggy launched a layette collection with Target Corporation, with 10% of sales going to help families in need. The layette line was designed by illustrator and children's book author Maira Kalman.

In 2016, Baby Buggy was rebranded as the Good Plus Foundation (also seen as Good+ Foundation). As Baby Buggy, the nonprofit had seen 20 million items donated to families across the United States. She shared with "Good Morning America" co-anchor George Stephanopoulos that the charity had outgrown its name.

=== Cookbooks ===
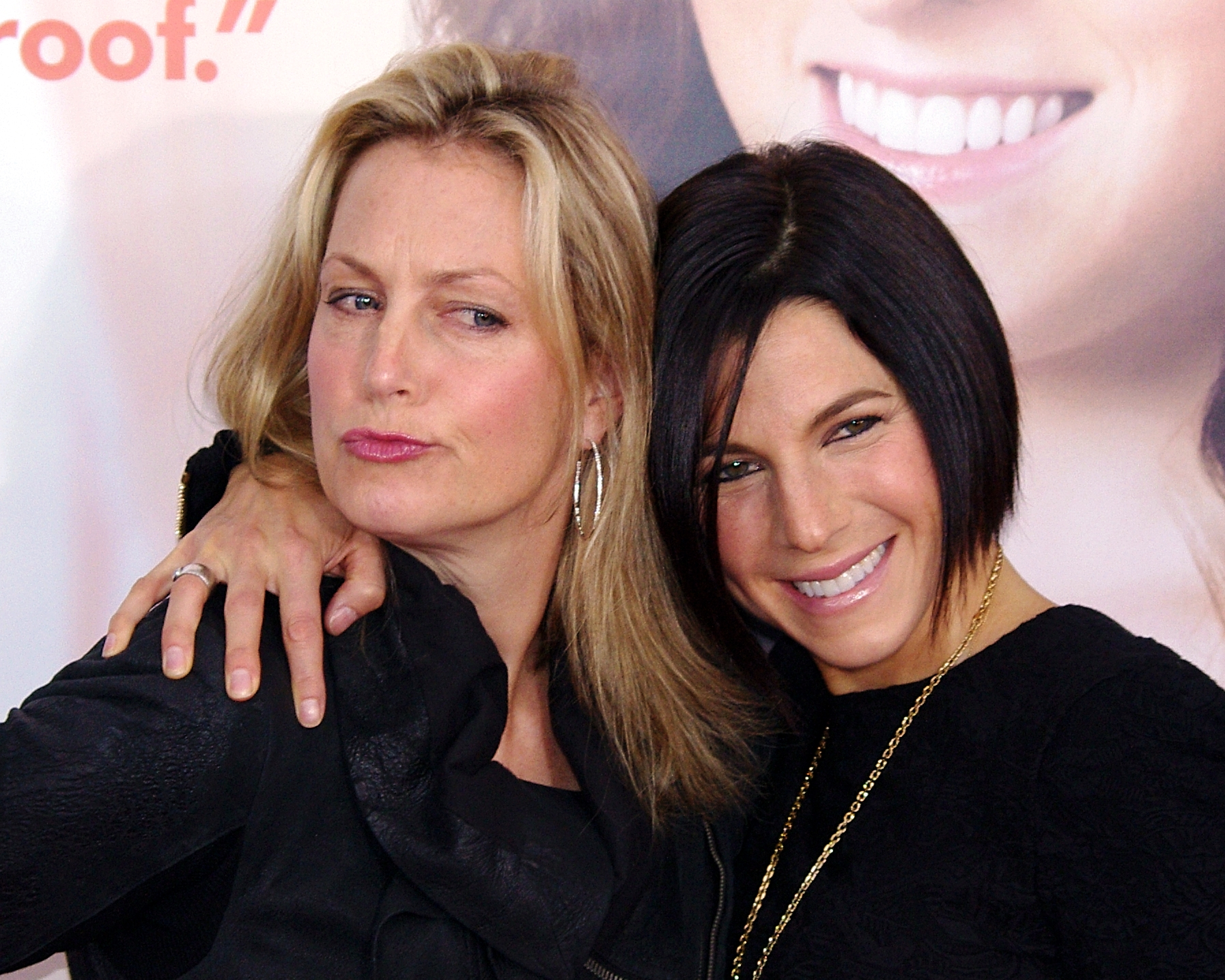
With comedian Alexandra Wentworth (left) at the 2012 premiere of What to Expect When You're Expecting

In October 2007, she released her first cookbook, Deceptively Delicious: Simple Secrets to Get Your Kids Eating Good Food, which contains strategies and recipes for making healthy food appealing to young children. The book features traditional recipes, such as mac and cheese and spaghetti and meatballs, that get a nutritional boost from vegetable purees. Deceptively Delicious was featured on The Oprah Winfrey Show, became a No. 1 New York Times best seller, remaining on the list for five months after its release. The book also reached No. 1 on Amazon.com and No. 2 on the USA Today best-seller list. Expert Joy Bauer added nutritional advice to the recipes, while Roxana Mehran and Mehmet Oz wrote the foreword. A portion of the royalties from Deceptively Delicious was donated to Baby Buggy.

In October 2010, Seinfeld released her second cookbook, Double Delicious! Good, Simple Food for Busy, Complicated Lives, which shared more healthy twists on traditional recipes, and incorporated vegetable purees, whole grains, and alternatives to processed sugars and flours. Like her first book, Double Delicious! was featured on The Oprah Winfrey Show.

In 2013 she released her third cookbook, The Can't Cook Book, billed as "100 recipes for the absolutely terrified!" In 2017 she released her fourth cookbook, Food Swings.

In 2021, she adopted a plant-based diet. She authored a vegan cookbook titled Vegan, at Times for those "who cannot quite commit" to a vegan diet all the time.

SHE Media lists Seinfeld as one of “22 Celebrity Moms Whose Cookbooks Will Solve Your Dinner Problems.”

=== Do it Delicious ===
In October 2010, Seinfeld launched a website for beginner cooks called "Do it Delicious." The website teaches at-home viewers how to prepare particular dishes or meals step-by-step, as well as a kitchen guide, store, blog, and community forum where users can submit tips and ask how-to questions.

== Personal life ==
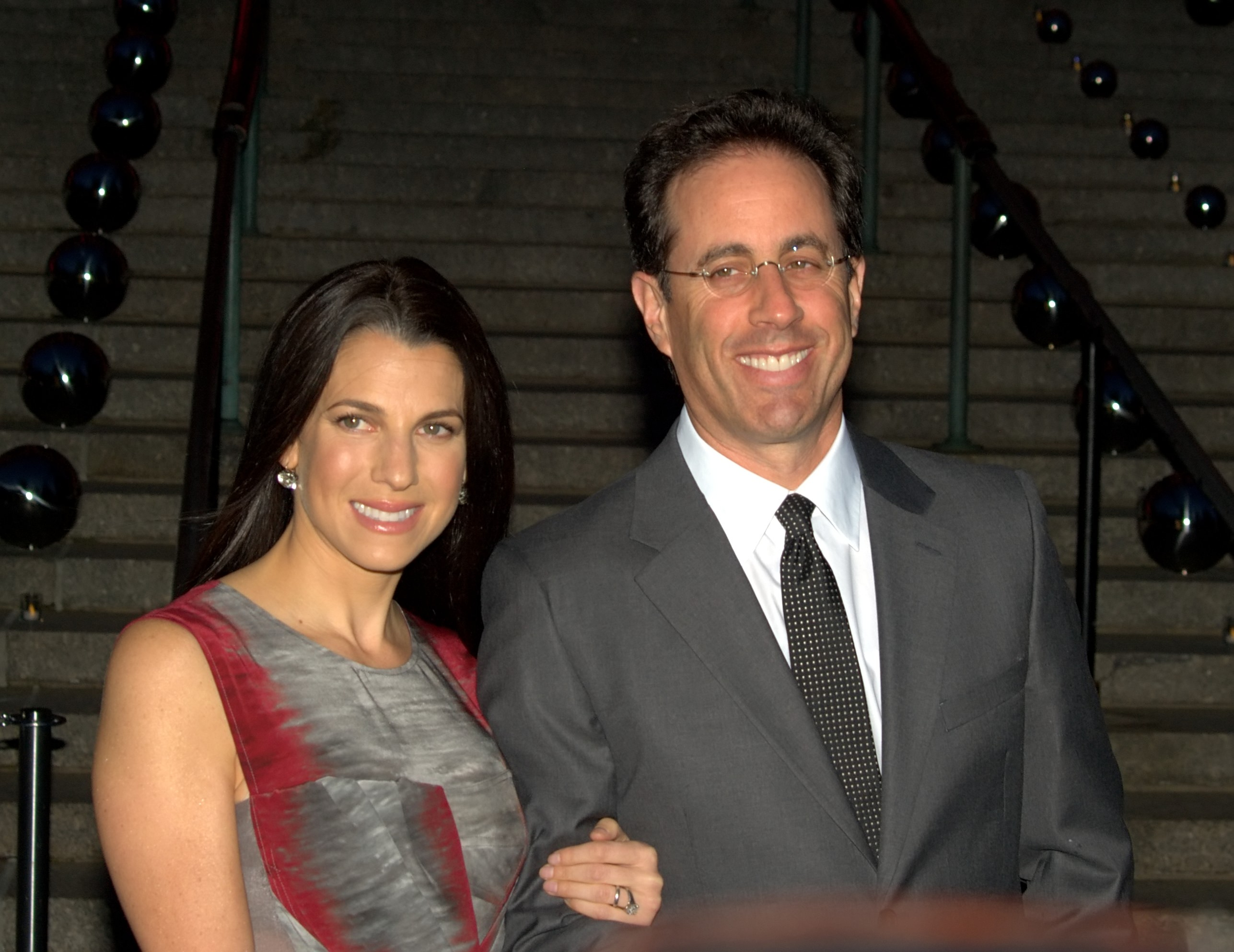
Jessica and her husband Jerry Seinfeld in New York, April 2010

In June 1998, Jessica married Eric Nederlander, a theatrical producer and the son of theater owner Robert Nederlander. In early August, after the wedding and a honeymoon in Italy with Nederlander, she met Jerry Seinfeld at a Reebok Sports Club and they began dating. Nederlander filed for divorce in October 1998, only four months after marriage. Sklar and Seinfeld became engaged in November 1999 and were married on December 25, 1999. Comedian George Wallace was the best man at the wedding.

After much criticism from Nederlander on Sklar's divorce and subsequent marriage, the Seinfelds gave a personal account of their relationship to Vogue in 2004. Jessica Seinfeld is quoted as having said,

I met Jerry at the end of what was the most difficult period of my life. I had just made a painful decision to dissolve a five-year relationship that began when I was 21 and culminated in a brief marriage. Jerry was neither the cause nor the effect of the breakup but his friendship gave me strength and resilience at a time of desperate need and it has formed the basis for my happiness in the years that have followed.

Jerry Seinfeld has said, "If it wasn't for Jess and the kids, I'd really blow my brains out. Jessica saved my life. She gave me something to care about."

The Seinfelds have three children, two sons and a daughter, all born in New York City.

=== Religion and politics ===
Seinfeld expressed support for Israel during the Gaza War. In April 2024, she donated $5,000 to Charity for Israel, a pro-Israel counter protest group at UCLA.

== Lawsuit and dismissal ==
Her first book, Deceptively Delicious, was published by HarperCollins on January 7, 2008, and contained a series of recipes to hide pureed fruits and vegetables inside children's meals.

After the release of her cookbook, Seinfeld was sued by author Missy Chase Lapine, who alleged copyright and trademark infringement. Lapine had previously submitted her book, The Sneaky Chef, to several publishers, including HarperCollins, before it was published by Running Press. Seinfeld denied the allegations, stating that the idea of hiding vegetables in children’s food was not original and had been used in earlier cookbooks. She explained that her recipes were based on her own experiences cooking for her children.

Lapine also filed a defamation claim against Jerry Seinfeld for remarks he made on Late Show with David Letterman, calling her "angry and hysterical", a "wacko", a "stalker", and a "nut job", and joking that "people with three names ... become assassins". In 2009, a federal judge dismissed all claims against Jessica Seinfeld, ruling that the books were "very different". The court allowed the defamation claim against Jerry Seinfeld to proceed in state court, but it was later dismissed in 2011 after Lapine's appeal was rejected.
