= Schleien =

Schleien is a surname. Notable people with the surname include:

- Charles Schleien (born 1953), American pediatrician
- Eric Schleien, American politician
- Lior Schleien (born 1978), Israeli television producer
