= Alan L. Schiller =

American clinical pathologist

- Born: United States
- Education: Bowdoin College, Chicago Medical School
- Known for: orthopaedic pathology; space medicine
- Scientific career
- Fields: clinical pathology
- Workplaces: Mount Sinai Medical Center

Alan L. Schiller is an American clinical pathologist and an expert in the effects of space and weightlessness on bone structure. Schiller has served on the Space Science Board of the Committee on Space Biology and Medicine of the National Academy of Sciences and as a member of the Life and Microgravity Sciences and Applications Advisory Committee of NASA. He currently serves on the board of directors of the National Space Biomedical Research Institute.

Schiller is the Irene Heinz and John LaPorte Given Professor and Chair Emeritus of the Department of Pathology at The Mount Sinai Medical Center in New York City. He is the author of more than 140 peer-reviewed papers, books, chapters and abstracts, and is listed among New York Magazine's Best Doctors of 2009.

== Biography ==
Schiller earned his A.B. in 1963 from Bowdoin College and his M.D. in 1967 at Chicago Medical School. Postdoctoral internships and residencies between 1967 and 1972 were held at Massachusetts General Hospital and Harvard University.

In 1969, while still a pathology student, Schiller joined the faculty at Tufts University School of Medicine. In 1974, he joined the faculty at Harvard Medical School as an Assistant Professor of Pathology; he was named Associate Professor in 1979. Subsequent appointments include appointments at Massachusetts Institute of Technology and New York University.

In 1988, Schiller joined the faculty at the Mount Sinai School of Medicine as Professor and Chair of the Department of Pathology.

Schiller has served on editorial boards of the Journal of Clinical Orthopedics and Related Research, the Journal of Bone and Joint Surgery, the Bone Research Laboratory, the International Academy of Pathology, Journal of Long-Term Effects of Medical Implants, Modern Pathology, Annals of Diagnostic Pathology Teaching Experience, McGraw-Hill Yearbook of Science and Technology, Encyclopædia Britannica and Skeletal Radiology. Additionally, Schiller serves on the board of directors of the National Space Biomedical Research Institute (NSBRI).

In 2013, Schiller joined the University of Hawaii, John A. Burns School of Medicine as a Professor and Chairman of the Department of Pathology.

== Military appointments ==
Beginning in 1972, Schiller served in the United States Navy Reserve as lieutenant commander. In 1995, he earned the rank of commander, then, in 2002, the rank of captain. Schiller currently serves as specialty leader in charge of all pathology navy reservists. In 2011, he retired from the Navy after 47 years due to a mandatory age requirement.

== Awards and honors ==
- 1981 Valentina Donahue-Turner Award, for Teaching Excellence, Harvard Medical School
- 1982 Alpha Omega Alpha, Alumnus Award, Chicago Medical School
- 1990 Alpha Omega Alpha Visiting Professorship School of Medicine in Shreveport, L.S.U.
- 1992 Honoree, 25 years, Harvard University, Recognition Award
- 1999 Honored Guest Professor − 36th Annual Homer H. Stryker Orthopaedic Pathology Conference- University of Michigan Medical Center
- 2001 Honored Guest Professor – Orthopaedic Pathology & Oncology OITE Review (38th Annual Homer Stryker Orthopaedic Pathology Conference)
- 2001 Board of Directors, National Space Biomedical Research Institute, NASA
- 2002–present American Top Doctors (Outstanding Medical Specialists)
- 2004 Who's Who Among America's Teachers Selected by the Best Students
- 2005 Leading Health Professionals of the World (International Biographical Centre), Cambridge, England
- 2005–present America's Top Doctors for Cancer

== Selected publications ==
- Walsh EF, Mechrefe A, Akelman E, Schiller AL (2005). "Giant cell tumor of tendon sheath". American Journal of Orthopedics. 34 (3): 116–21. PMID 15828513.
- Dunker J, Larsson U, Petersson D, Forsell J, Schiller AL, Alderborn A, Berg LM (2003). "Parallel DNA template preparation using a vacuum filtration sample transfer device". BioTechniques. 34 (4): 862–6, 868. doi:10.2144/03344pf01. PMID 12703311.
- Schiller AL, Strauchen JA (1999). "Foucar K: chronic lymphoid leukemias and lymphoproliferative disorders. Mod Pathol 12:141, 1999". Modern Pathology. 12 (10): 990. PMID 10530566.
- Yen BC, Kahn H, Schiller AL, Klein MJ, Phelps RG, Lebwohl MG (1993). "Multiple hamartoma syndrome with osteosarcoma". Archives of Pathology & Laboratory Medicine. 117 (12): 1252–4. PMID 8250698.
- O'Connell JX, Rosenthal DI, Mankin HJ, Gudger GK, Dickersin GR, Schiller AL, Rosenberg AE (1993). "A unique multifocal osteoblastoma-like tumor of the bones of a single lower extremity. Report of a case". The Journal of Bone and Joint Surgery. American Volume. 75 (4): 597–602. doi:10.2106/00004623-199304000-00015. PMID 8478388.
- Prodromos CC, Ferry JA, Schiller AL, Zarins B (1990). "Histological studies of the glenoid labrum from fetal life to old age". The Journal of Bone and Joint Surgery. American Volume. 72 (9): 1344–8. doi:10.2106/00004623-199072090-00010. PMID 2229110.
- Walker PS, Rodger RF, Miegel RE, Schiller AL, Deland JT, Robertson DD (1990). "An investigation of a compliant interface for press-fit joint replacement". Journal of Orthopaedic Research. 8 (3): 453–63. doi:10.1002/jor.1100080317. PMID 2324862. S2CID 22732988.
- Matsuno T, Gebhardt MC, Schiller AL, Rosenberg AE, Mankin HJ (1988). "The use of flow cytometry as a diagnostic aid in the management of soft-tissue tumors". The Journal of Bone and Joint Surgery. American Volume. 70 (5): 751–9. doi:10.2106/00004623-198870050-00017. PMID 3392069.
- Cooper GL, Schiller AL, Hopkins CC (1988). "Possible role of capillary action in pathogenesis of experimental catheter-associated dermal tunnel infections". Journal of Clinical Microbiology. 26 (1): 8–12. doi:10.1128/JCM.26.1.8-12.1988. PMC 266164. PMID 3343317.
- Willett CG, Schiller AL, Suit HD, Mankin HJ, Rosenberg A (1987). "The histologic response of soft tissue sarcoma to radiation therapy". Cancer. 60 (7): 1500–4. doi:10.1002/1097-0142(19871001)60:7<1500::AID-CNCR2820600716>3.0.CO;2-1. PMID 3040219. S2CID 34044144.
- Rosenberg AE, Schiller AL (1987). "Soft tissue sarcomas of the hand". Hand Clinics. 3 (2): 247–61. doi:10.1016/S0749-0712(21)00656-9. PMID 3034928.
- Floyd WE 3rd, Zaleske DJ, Schiller AL, Trahan C, Mankin HJ (1987). "Vascular events associated with the appearance of the secondary center of ossification in the murine distal femoral epiphysis". The Journal of Bone and Joint Surgery. American Volume. 69 (2): 185–90. doi:10.2106/00004623-198769020-00004. PMID 2433291.
- Coltrera MD, Googe PB, Harrist TJ, Hyams VJ, Schiller AL, Goodman ML (1986). "Chondrosarcoma of the temporal bone. Diagnosis and treatment of 13 cases and review of the literature". Cancer. 58 (12): 2689–96. doi:10.1002/1097-0142(19861215)58:12<2689::AID-CNCR2820581224>3.0.CO;2-P. PMID 3022910.
- Jasty MJ, Floyd WE 3rd, Schiller AL, Goldring SR, Harris WH (1986). "Localized osteolysis in stable, non-septic total hip replacement". The Journal of Bone and Joint Surgery. American Volume. 68 (6): 912–9. doi:10.2106/00004623-198668060-00014. PMID 3525569.
- Goldring SR, Schiller AL, Mankin HJ, Dayer JM, Krane SM (1986). "Characterization of cells from human giant cell tumors of bone". Clinical Orthopaedics and Related Research. 204 (204): 59–75. doi:10.1097/00003086-198603000-00007. PMID 3006962.
- Nojima T, Gebhardt MC, Mankin HJ, Schiller AL (1986). "Extraosseous osteosarcoma presenting with intestinal hemorrhage: case report and literature review". Human Pathology. 17 (1): 85–7. doi:10.1016/S0046-8177(86)80159-9. PMID 3510964.
- Gebhardt MC, Campbell CJ, Schiller AL, Mankin HJ (1985). "Desmoplastic fibroma of bone. A report of eight cases and review of the literature". The Journal of Bone and Joint Surgery. American Volume. 67 (5): 732–47. doi:10.2106/00004623-198567050-00008. PMID 3997926.
- Horiuchi N, Clemens TL, Schiller AL, Holick MF (1985). "Detection and developmental changes of the 1,25-(OH)2-D3 receptor concentration in mouse skin and intestine". The Journal of Investigative Dermatology. 84 (6): 461–4. doi:10.1111/1523-1747.ep12272358. PMID 2987364.
- Mankin HJ, Connor JF, Schiller AL, Perlmutter N, Alho A, McGuire M (1985). "Grading of bone tumors by analysis of nuclear DNA content using flow cytometry". The Journal of Bone and Joint Surgery. American Volume. 67 (3): 404–13. doi:10.2106/00004623-198567030-00009. PMID 2579083.
- Schiller AL (1985). "Diagnosis of borderline cartilage lesions of bone". Seminars in Diagnostic Pathology. 2 (1): 42–62. PMID 3870763.
