= Samuel Waxman =

American oncologist (born 1936)

Harold Waxman
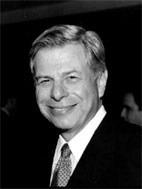
- Born: 1936 (age 89–90); New York City, New York, U.S.
- Education: Cornell University
- Scientific career
- Fields: Hematology; Medical Oncology
- Workplaces: Icahn School of Medicine at Mount Sinai

Samuel Waxman is the Zena and Michael A. Wiener Professor of Medicine (Cancer), Distinguished Service Professor of Medicine, Hematology, and Medical Oncology, and the Distinguished Service Professor of Oncological Sciences at the Mount Sinai School of Medicine in New York City, where he has been a member of the faculty for over 30 years.

Waxman has written hundreds of scientific papers and was one of the first researchers to study differentiation therapy as a method of cancer treatment.

He has also authored various chapters in textbooks on subjects including chemotherapy, hematology, and nutrition, and has written the books Differentiation Therapy and The Leukemia Cell.

In 1976, Waxman founded the Samuel Waxman Cancer Research Foundation, which is now an international organization dedicated to preventing, fighting, and curing cancer. The Waxman Foundation operates a collaborative group called the Institute Without Walls, which is aimed towards bringing researches from around the world together into investigative groups. Since its inception, the Waxman Foundation has provided grants of over $75 million to more than 175 researchers. For the 2010–11 year, the foundation provided grants totaling over $2 million to 13 investigative collaborations and 3 individual researchers. He now serves as the foundation's Scientific Director.

Waxman pursued undergraduate studies at Cornell University, where he received his B.S. in 1957, and attended medical school at the State University of New York Downstate Medical Center, where he received his M.D. in 1963, graduating Summa Cum Laude. He completed his residency and research fellowships at the Mount Sinai Hospital in New York City.
