= Marta Filizola =

Computational biophysicist

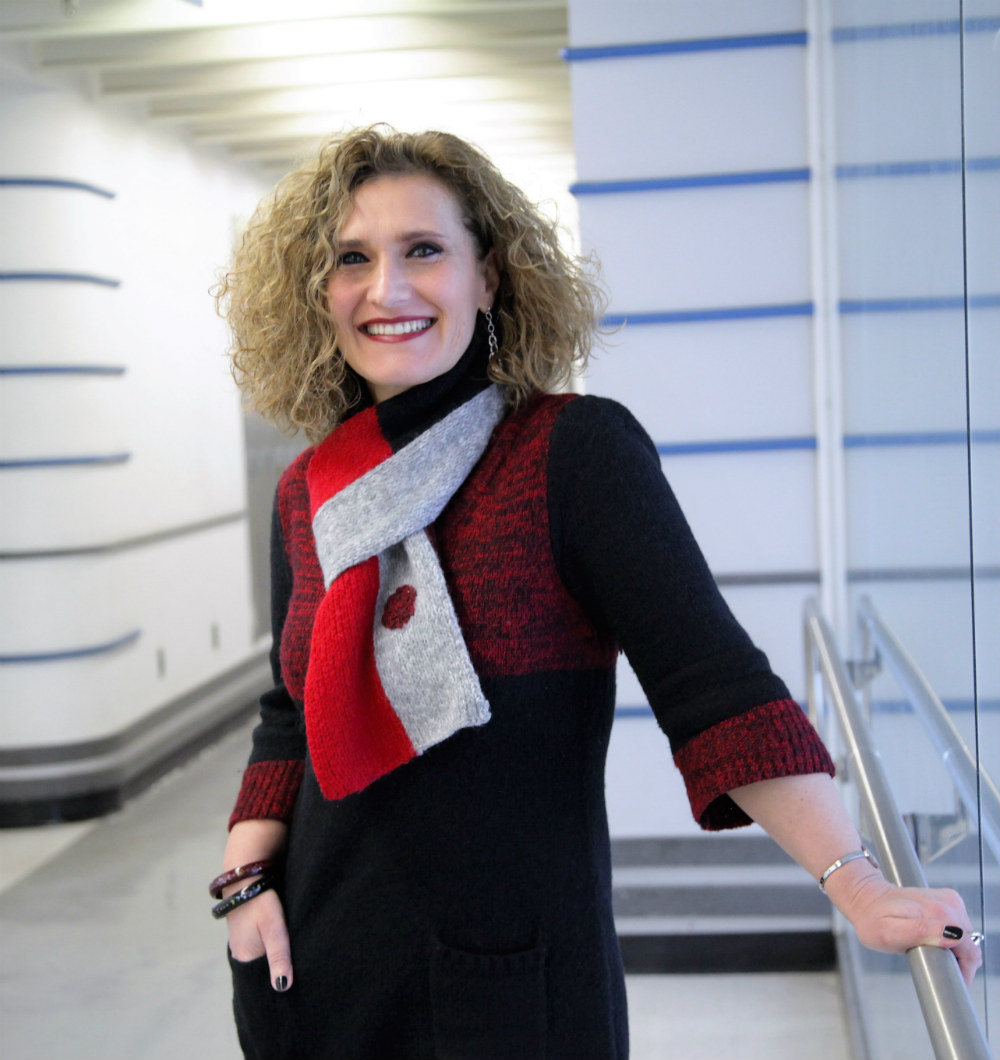
- Filizola in 2016
- Born: Naples, Italy
- Education: University of Naples "Federico II", II University of Naples
- Occupations: Dean of The Graduate School of Biomedical Sciences at the Icahn School of Medicine at Mount Sinai Professor, Department of Pharmacological Sciences, Professor, Department of Neuroscience
- Employer: Icahn School of Medicine at Mount Sinai
- Known for: Chemistry, Computational Biology, Biophysics
- Website: profiles.mountsinai.org/marta-filizola

Marta Filizola is a computational biophysicist who studies membrane proteins. Filizola's research concerns drug discovery and the application of computational chemistry and theoretical chemistry to biochemical and biomedical problems.

Filizola is the dean of the graduate school of biomedical sciences at the Icahn School of Medicine at Mount Sinai in New York City. She is a professor of pharmacological sciences and neuroscience, and also the Sharon and Frederick A. Klingenstein-Nathan G. Kase Professor.

She is best known for her work aimed at providing mechanistic insight into the structure, dynamics, and function of G protein-coupled receptors using methods such as molecular modeling, bioinformatics, cheminformatics, enhanced molecular dynamics simulations, and rational drug design approaches. The Filizola laboratory's research has steadily been funded by the National Institutes of Health (NIH) since 2005.

As of 2016, Filizola is active in five research projects funded by the National Institute on Drug Abuse (NIDA), the National Institute of Mental Health (NIMH), and the National Heart, Lung, and Blood Institute (NHLBI).

== Education ==
Born in Italy, Filizola received her bachelor's and master's degrees in chemistry from the University Federico II in Naples (class of 1993), and earned her PhD in computational chemistry from the Second University of Naples in 1999, though conducting most of her doctoral studies at the Department of Chemical Engineering of the Polytechnic University of Catalonia in Barcelona, Spain. She went on to pursue a postdoctorate in computational biophysics from the Molecular Research Institute in California, moving to New York City in 2001.

== Career ==
Filizola joined the Department of Physiology & Biophysics at Mount Sinai School of Medicine (MSSM) as an instructor in 2002. She continued in this role at Weill Medical College at Cornell University. and was promoted assistant professor in 2005. She returned to MSSM as an assistant professor in the Department of Structural and Chemical Biology, where she was later promoted associate professor (with tenure since January 2013), and then full professor in 2014.

Following three years as co-director of the Structural/Chemical Biology and Molecular Design Graduate Program, and one year as co-director of the Biophysics and Systems Pharmacology Graduate Program, she was appointed dean of the graduate school of biomedical sciences at MSSM in May 2016. Filizola also served as grant reviewer for the NIH and other agencies for over 10 years. Currently, she is a regular study section member of the Biophysics of Neural Systems (BPNS) study section of NIH.

== Awards and honors ==
Filizola's awards and honors include the title of European doctor in biotechnology from the European Association for Higher Education in Biotechnology in Genova, Italy (1999), a National Research Service Award from NIDA (2002), The Doctor Harold and Golden Lamport Award for Excellence in Basic Research from Mount Sinai School of Medicine (2008), and an Independent Scientist Award from NIDA (2009–present). She is also a member of the Faculty of 1000 for Pharmacology and Drug Discovery since 2013.

== Research ==
Filizola's research program is mainly focused on G Protein-Coupled Receptors (GPCRs), which are the targets for about half of all currently used drugs. Special effort in her lab has been devoted to the subfamily of opioid receptors to discover/design novel painkillers with reduced abuse liability and other adverse effects. A second important line of investigation in the Filizola lab is on beta3 integrins towards the discovery of novel therapeutics to treat renal, hematologic, neoplastic, bone, and/or fibrotic diseases.

To obtain insight into the structure, dynamics, and function of GPCRs and beta3 integrins, the Filizola lab uses computational structural biology tools such as: molecular modeling, bioinformatics, cheminformatics, molecular dynamics simulations, and rational drug design approaches. Much of the work is done in close collaboration with major experimental labs with whom the lab has established longstanding synergistic ties.

Dr. Filizola is the author of over 100 original papers and chapters in the areas of computational chemistry/biophysics and drug discovery, as well as the editor of 2 books: "G Protein-Coupled Receptors - Modeling and Simulation" and "G Protein-Coupled Receptors in Drug Discovery". She is also an inventor, with a number of patents to her credit.

== Publications ==
As of 2026, Filizola has been cited 10,943 times, has an h-index of 53 and an i10-index of 121. Her top four publications cited articles by rank:

- Promoting transparency and reproducibility in enhanced molecular simulations. Nat Methods 16, 670–673 (2019). https://doi.org/10.1038/s41592-019-0506-8 PMID 31363226 Cited by 1065
- González-Maeso, Javier, et al. "Identification of a Serotonin/Glutamate Receptor Complex Implicated in Psychosis." Nature, vol. 452, no. 7183, 2008, pp. 93–97, https://doi.org/10.1038/nature06612 PMID 18297054 Cited by 995
- Ferré, Sergi, et al. "G Protein–Coupled Receptor Oligomerization Revisited: Functional and Pharmacological Perspectives." Pharmacological Reviews, vol. 66, no. 2, 2014, pp. 413–434, https://doi.org/10.1124/pr.113.008052 PMID 24515674 Cited by 661
- Guo W, Urizar E, Kralikova M, Mobarec JC, Shi L, Filizola M, Javitch JA. Dopamine D2 receptors form higher order oligomers at physiological expression levels. EMBO J. 2008 Sep 3;27(17):2293-304. doi: 10.1038/emboj.2008.153. PMID 18668123 Cited by 395
