= Andy S. Jagoda =

American academic and author

- Born: 1952 (age 73–74)
- Education: Georgetown University
- Scientific career
- Fields: Emergency medicine
- Workplaces: Icahn School of Medicine at Mount Sinai

Andy S. Jagoda (born 1952) is an American physician and Professor and Chair Emeritus of the Department of Emergency Medicine at Icahn School of Medicine at Mount Sinai.

He edited and authored 14 books, including The Good Housekeeping Family First Aid Book and the textbook Neurologic Emergencies. He is an editor of the 9th edition of Rosen’s Emergency Medicine.

== Education and career ==
=== Early life ===
Jagoda is the son of a Jewish singer, Flory Papo Jagoda, and her husband, builder Harry Jagoda. He is one of four siblings including two sisters, Lori and Betty, and brother, Elliot, who died in 2014. He is married to neuro-psychiatrist Silvana Riggio. With Riggio, he contributed vocals to his mother's song, Ocho Kandelikas, which reportedly became one of the "best-known Hanukah songs all over the world."

=== Education ===
He received his medical degree from Georgetown University in 1982. He completed a residency in emergency medicine at the joint program of Georgetown/George Washington/Maryland Institute for Emergency Medical Services System in 1985.

=== Military service ===
As a doctor in the United States Navy, Jagoda completed two tours in the Middle East, first during the Iran–Iraq War, and then again during Desert Storm/Desert Shield. In 1990, he earned the rank of lieutenant commander. He was later made assistant professor at the Department of Military Medicine/Emergency Medicine at the Uniformed Services University of the Health Sciences in Bethesda, Maryland. He received a Commendation Medal for meritorious service from the Navy.

=== Faculty work ===
Jagoda joined the faculty of George Washington University, then the University of Florida. He joined the staff at Mount Sinai Medical Center in 1995, earning the rank of Professor of Emergency Medicine with tenure in 2000. In 2009, he was named Chair of the Department of Emergency Medicine.

=== Other work ===
Jagoda led the credentialing committee for the National Football League (NFL) Airway Management Physician Program and played a role in setting up the NFL Visiting Team Medical Liaison program.

=== Editorial and associations ===
As of 2024, Jagoda is Editor-in-chief of Emergency Medicine Practice. He is a member of the executive committee of the Brain Attack Coalition at the National Institute of Neurological Disorders and Stroke (part of the National Institutes of Health) and of the executive board of the Foundation for Education and Research on Neurologic Emergencies (FERNE). He is also on the advisory board of the Indian Head Injury Foundation and of the Brain Trauma Foundation where he also serves as the EMS Director.

He is past chair of the Clinical Policies Committee of the American College of Emergency Physicians (ACEP), where his work with the committee for 14 years facilitated the evolution from a consensus-based process to an evidence-based process and promoted ACEP's practice guideline methodology both nationally and internationally. He has organized evidence-based symposiums in Italy, the Netherlands, and Chile and co-organized the first Joint ACEP/Italian Congress on Emergency Medicine.

=== Litigation ===
In the case of Newman v. Mount Sinai Medical Center, Inc., plaintiff Ms. Aja Newman alleged that she was sexually assaulted by one Dr. David Newman (no relation) in a private room. Dr. David Newman was found culpable. Jagoda and eight other named defendants, who were in the vicinity at the time, were dismissed from all allegations.

== Publications ==
=== Peer-reviewed articles ===
Jagoda's most cited publications as of 2024, reported by Google Scholar

- Glauser, T., Shinnar, S., Gloss, D., Alldredge, B., Arya, R., Bainbridge, J., Bare, M., Bleck, T., Dodson, W.E., Garrity, L. and Jagoda, A., 2016. Evidence-based guideline: treatment of convulsive status epilepticus in children and adults: report of the Guideline Committee of the American Epilepsy Society. Epilepsy currents, 16(1), pp. 48–61. Cited by 1219
- Alberts, M.J., Hademenos, G., Latchaw, R.E., Jagoda, A., Marler, J.R., Mayberg, M.R., Starke, R.D., Todd, H.W., Viste, K.M., Girgus, M. and Shephard, T., 2000. Recommendations for the establishment of primary stroke centers. Jama, 283(23), pp. 3102–3109. Cited by 865
- Alberts, M.J., Latchaw, R.E., Selman, W.R., Shephard, T., Hadley, M.N., Brass, L.M., Koroshetz, W., Marler, J.R., Booss, J., Zorowitz, R.D. and Croft, J.B., 2005. Recommendations for comprehensive stroke centers: a consensus statement from the Brain Attack Coalition. Stroke, 36(7), pp. 1597–1616. Cited by 752
- Jagoda, A.S., Bazarian, J.J., Bruns Jr, J.J., Cantrill, S.V., Gean, A.D., Howard, P.K., Ghajar, J., Riggio, S., Wright, D.W., Wears, R.L. and Bakshy, A., 2009. Clinical policy: neuroimaging and decision-making in adult mild traumatic brain injury in the acute setting. Journal of Emergency Nursing, 35(2), pp.e5-e40. Cited by 683
- Warden, D.L., Gordon, B., McAllister, T.W., Silver, J.M., Barth, J.T., Bruns, J., Drake, A., Gentry, T., Jagoda, A., Katz, D.I. and Kraus, J., 2006. Guidelines for the pharmacologic treatment of neurobehavioral sequelae of traumatic brain injury. Journal of neurotrauma, 23(10), pp. 1468–1501. Cited by 534

=== Books ===
Partial list, 2024:

- The Good Housekeeping Family First Aid Book. Andy Jagoda, author. Hearst Publishers. 2000; 295 pages. ISBN 0-688-17894-4
- Jagoda A, Riggio S (guest editors): Seizures in the Emergency Department, Emergency Medicine Clinics of North America, W.B. Saunders, Philadelphia, November 1994. 220 pages. ISBN 978-1455704385
- Howell J, Altieri M, Jagoda A, Prescott J, Scott J, Stair T (editors): Emergency Medicine, W.B. Saunders, Philadelphia, 1997; 1735 pages.
- Jagoda A, Richardson L (guest editors): Neurologic Emergencies, Emergency Medicine Clinics of North America, W. B. Saunders, Philadelphia, 1997; 230 pages. ISBN 9780323763288
- Jagoda A, Riggio S (guest editors): Psychiatric Emergencies, Emergency Medicine Clinics of North America, W.B. Saunders, Philadelphia, May 2000.
- Henry G, Jagoda A, Little N, Pelligrino T. Neurologic Emergencies. McGraw Hill, New York. 2003; 346 pages. ISBN 0-07-163521-1
- Jagoda A. Good Housekeeping Family First Aid Handbook, 2nd Edition. Hearst Publishers. 2004. ISBN 978-1588162991
- Henry G, Jagoda A, Little N, Pelligrino T. Neurologic Emergencies, third edition. McGraw Hill, New York. April 2010; 389 pages. ISBN 978-0071635219
- Riggio S, Jagoda A. Traumatic Brain Injury. Psychiatry Clinics of North America. Elsevier, Philadelphia. December 2010.
- Jagoda A, Sloan E. Seizures in the Emergency Department. Emergency Medicine Clinics of North America. Elsevier, Philadelphia. February 2011. ISBN 978-1455704385
- Jagoda A, Riggio, S (editors). Traumatic Brain Injury: Improving the Continuum of Care. Indian Head Injury Foundation Publication. 183 pages.
- Riggio, Silvana, and Andy Jagoda. Sport Psychiatry: Maximizing Performance, an Issue of Psychiatric Clinics of North America Edited by Silvana Riggio, Andy Jagoda. 1st ed., Elsevier, 2021. ISBN 9780323835923
