= Marek Mlodzik =

Marek Mlodzik is the Chair of the Department of Molecular, Cell and Developmental Biology and also holds professorships in Oncological Sciences and Ophthalmology at the Mount Sinai School of Medicine in New York City. Prior to this (from 1991 to 2000) he was a Group Leader at EMBL Heidelberg. In 1997, Mlodzik was elected as a member of the European Molecular Biology Organization.

He is known for his contributions to the generation of planar cell polarity in the Drosophila melanogaster epithelium.
