= Brendan Carr (physician) =

American emergency physician and academic health leader

Brendan G. Carr
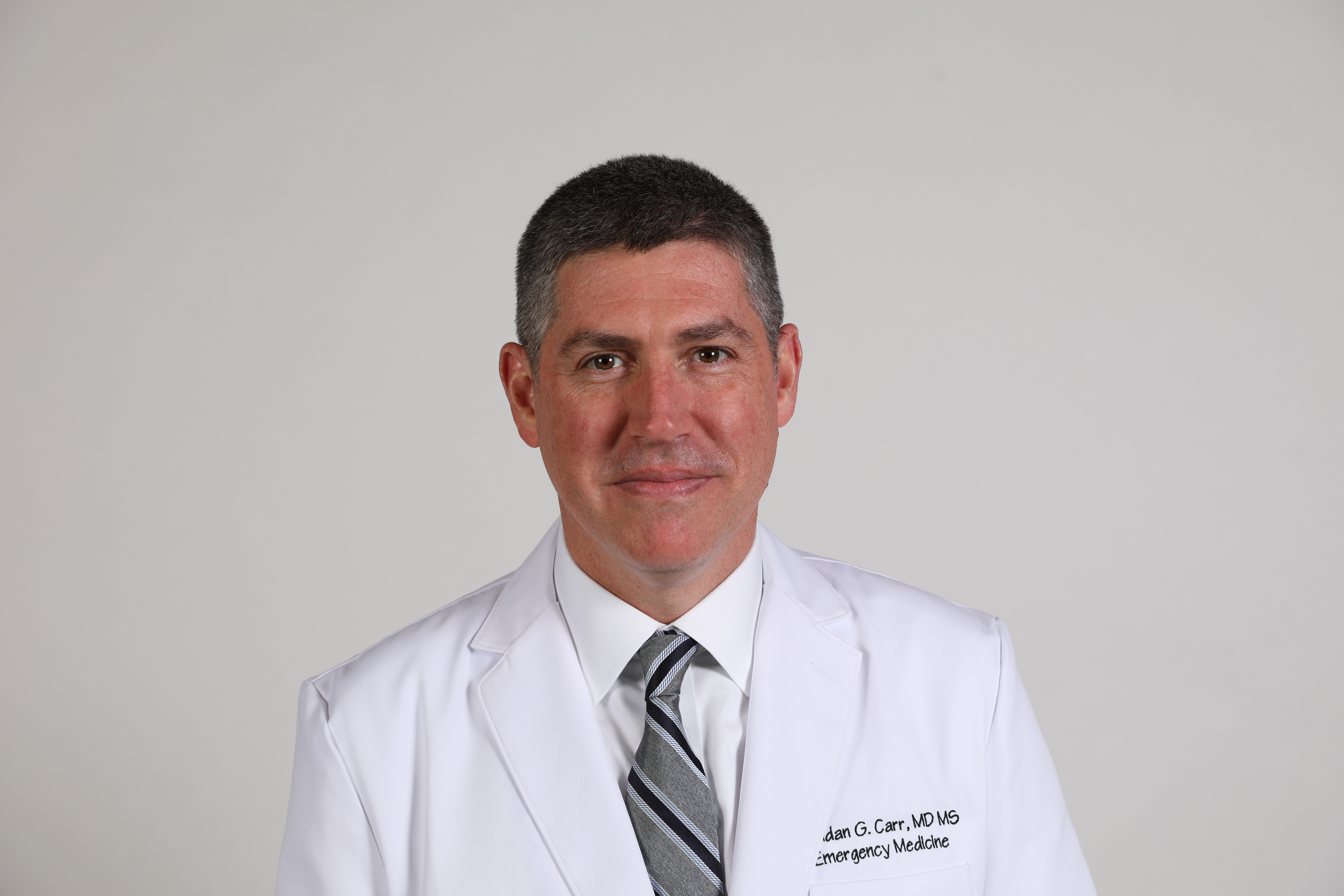
- Born: Brendan G. Carr
- Occupations: Emergency physician; Health services researcher; Academic administrator
- Title: Chief Executive Officer and Kenneth L. Davis, MD, Distinguished Chair, Mount Sinai Health System

Academic background
- Education: Loyola University Maryland (BS, MA); Temple University School of Medicine (MD); University of Pennsylvania (MS)

Academic work
- Discipline: Emergency medicine; Health policy; Health services research
- Institutions: Perelman School of Medicine at the University of Pennsylvania; Thomas Jefferson University; Mount Sinai Health System
- Website: profiles.mountsinai.org/brendan-carr

Brendan G. Carr is an American emergency physician, health services researcher, and academic health leader. He is Chief Executive Officer and the Kenneth L. Davis, MD, Distinguished Chair of the Mount Sinai Health System in New York City, and a Professor of Emergency Medicine at the Icahn School of Medicine at Mount Sinai. He was previously Chair of Emergency Medicine for the Icahn School of Medicine and the Mount Sinai Health System and was elected to the National Academy of Medicine in 2020 for his contributions to emergency care systems and health policy.

Carr's research focuses on how emergency care systems, trauma networks, and telehealth affect outcomes for patients with time-sensitive conditions such as trauma, stroke, sepsis, and cardiac arrest. He is known for work on regionalized emergency care, trauma systems, and the use of telemedicine in disaster and pandemic response.

== Education ==
Carr earned a Bachelor of Science in psychology and a Master of Arts in clinical psychology from Loyola University Maryland, an MD from Temple University School of Medicine, and a Master of Science in Health Policy Research from the University of Pennsylvania.

He completed a residency in emergency medicine and a fellowship in trauma and surgical critical care, followed by a fellowship in health policy research as a Robert Wood Johnson Foundation Clinical Scholar at the University of Pennsylvania.

== Career ==
=== Academic positions ===
At the Perelman School of Medicine at the University of Pennsylvania, Carr served on the faculty in the Department of Emergency Medicine and in the Department of Biostatistics and Epidemiology, and as a Senior Fellow at the Leonard Davis Institute of Health Economics.

He later joined Thomas Jefferson University as Professor and Vice Chair of Health Policy in the Department of Emergency Medicine, where he led a population science research group and served as Associate Dean for Healthcare Delivery Innovation. His work there included evaluating innovations in care delivery, such as telehealth and "tele-triage" models to improve access and safety for patients and clinicians.

Carr joined the Icahn School of Medicine at Mount Sinai and Mount Sinai Health System as Chair of Emergency Medicine, leading emergency care across the system and advancing research on emergency care delivery and telehealth.

=== Federal appointments and policy roles ===
From 2012 to 2020, Carr served as Director of the Emergency Care Coordination Center (ECCC) within the Office of the Assistant Secretary for Preparedness and Response at the United States Department of Health and Human Services, where he focused on integrating emergency care into the broader U.S. health system and improving coordination for trauma and disaster response.

Carr has also served as an adviser to the World Health Organization on emergency care and injury systems.

=== Mount Sinai Health System ===
In 2020, Carr was elected to the National Academy of Medicine while serving as Chair of Emergency Medicine at Mount Sinai. He received the "Chair of the Year" Award from the Emergency Medicine Residents' Association in 2022.

In 2024, he became Chief Executive Officer and the Kenneth L. Davis, MD, Distinguished Chair of the Mount Sinai Health System, while continuing as a professor of emergency medicine. In this role he oversees strategy, operations, and business development for the system, including its hospitals, ambulatory network, and the Icahn School of Medicine.

== Research ==
Carr's research examines how emergency care system design and regionalization influence outcomes for patients with unplanned critical illness, including trauma, stroke, sepsis, and cardiac arrest. His work has addressed trauma system planning for adults and children, emergency systems of care, and the use of population-based outcome measures to evaluate emergency care delivery.

He is widely cited for work on telemedicine and emergency care, including a 2020 New England Journal of Medicine perspective on telemedicine during the COVID-19 pandemic.

=== Grants and foundation support ===
Carr has served as principal investigator on research grants from the Agency for Healthcare Research and Quality (AHRQ), the Centers for Disease Control and Prevention (CDC), and the National Institutes of Health (NIH), focusing on trauma systems, geography of acute care, and regional cardiac arrest outcomes and systems of care.

== Awards and honors ==
Carr has received several professional awards, including the Society for Academic Emergency Medicine Young Investigator Award, the American College of Emergency Physicians Young Physician Leadership Fellowship, a Golden Apple teaching award from the University of Pennsylvania, Best Manuscript recognition from the Eastern Association for the Surgery of Trauma, and inclusion in Philadelphia Magazine's "Top Doctors" lists.

In 2020 he was elected to the National Academy of Medicine. In 2022 he received the "Chair of the Year Award" from the Emergency Medicine Residents' Association. He serves on the editorial board of Annals of Emergency Medicine.

== Selected publications ==
- Hollander JE, Carr BG. "Virtually Perfect? Telemedicine for Covid-19." New England Journal of Medicine. 2020;382(18):1679–1681.
- Gaieski DF, Edwards JM, Kallan MJ, Carr BG. "Benchmarking the incidence and mortality of severe sepsis in the United States." Critical Care Medicine. 2013;41(5):1167–1174.
- Merchant RM, Yang L, Becker LB, et al. "Incidence of treated cardiac arrest in hospitalized patients in the United States." Critical Care Medicine. 2011;39(11):2401–2406.
- Lurie N, Carr BG. "The Role of Telehealth in the Medical Response to Disasters." JAMA Internal Medicine. 2018;178(6):745–746.
- Gaieski DF, Band RA, Abella BS, et al. "Early goal-directed hemodynamic optimization combined with therapeutic hypothermia in comatose survivors of out-of-hospital cardiac arrest." Resuscitation. 2009;80(4):418–424.
