= Barry A. Love =

American pediatric cardiologist

- Education: University of Toronto; University of Western Ontario; McGill University; Harvard University
- Medical career
- Profession: pediatrician, cardiologist
- Institutions: Montreal Children's Hospital; Mount Sinai Medical Center
- Sub-specialties: pediatric heart problems

Barry A. Love is an American cardiologist specializing in pediatric and congenital heart problems.

Love is director of the Congenital Cardiac Catheterization Laboratory at the Mount Sinai Medical Center and assistant professor of both pediatrics and cardiology at the Mount Sinai School of Medicine, both in New York City. He specializes in pediatric interventional catheterization, electrophysiology and arrhythmia and syncope.

Love is the author of 3 book chapters and 20 peer-reviewed publications and was listed in Castle Connolly's Top Doctors from 2009 to 2011 and among New York's Super Doctors from 2008 to 2011. He lectures and teaches nationally and internationally about cardiac interventions.

== Biography ==
Love studied immunology and microbiology at the University of Toronto and graduated medical school cum laude at the University of Western Ontario in 1993. He completed a residency in pediatrics at the Montreal Children's Hospital, McGill University in 1996, and a fellowship at Children's Hospital Boston (Harvard University) in 2000.

Love served as assistant professor of pediatrics in the Division of Cardiology at Montreal Children's Hospital from 2000 to 2002. In 2003, he joined the Mount Sinai Medical Center as assistant professor of both pediatrics and cardiology and director of the Congenital Cardiac Catheterization Laboratory. He carries additional hospital appointment at Hackensack University Medical Center, both in New Jersey.

== Book chapters ==
- Love BA. Aortopulmonary Septal Defect in eMedicine Pediatrics 2001. Revised 2009.
- Love BA. Patent Foramen Ovale in eMedicine Pediatrics 2001. Revised 2009.
- Love BA. Congenital Heart Disease in Comprehensive Pediatric Hospital Medicine. Zaoutis LB, Chiang VW. 2007. ISBN 0-323-03004-1

== Publications ==
- Singh, SM; Neuzil, P; Skoka, J; et al. (April 2011). "Percutaneous transhepatic venous access for catheter ablation procedures in patients with interruption of the inferior vena cava". Circ Arrhythmia Electrophysiol. 4 (2): 235–41. doi:10.1161/CIRCEP.110.960856. PMID 21270102. S2CID 7096671.
- Love, BA; Whang, B; Filsoufi, F (July 2011). "Perventricular device closure of post-myocardial infarction ventricular septal defect on the beating heart". J. Thorac. Cardiovasc. Surg. 142 (1): 230–2. doi:10.1016/j.jtcvs.2010.10.039. PMID 21247590.
- Love, BA; Nielsen, J; Chinitz, J; Filsoufi, F (2010). "Transcatheter closure of recurrent postmyocardial infarction ventricular septal defect facilitated by percutaneous left ventricle access". Semin. Thorac. Cardiovasc. Surg. 22 (3): 259–61. doi:10.1053/j.semtcvs.2010.10.003. PMID 21167463.
- Love, BA; Fischer, GW; Mittnacht, A; Kalman, J; Adams, DH (March 2010). "Transcatheter repair of perivalvular regurgitation". Semin Cardiothorac Vasc Anesth. 14 (1): 68–72. doi:10.1177/1089253210364064. PMID 20472633. S2CID 206683295.
- Love, BA; Parness, IA; Fuster, V (December 2009). "Membranous septal aneurysm causing right ventricular outflow tract obstruction". Clin Cardiol. 32 (12): E87. doi:10.1002/clc.20661. PMC 6652874. PMID 20014190.
- Sasaki, N; Joashi, UC; Vergara, M; Saland, JM; Love, BA (December 2009). "Postrenal biopsy AVM leading to severe hypertension and dilated cardiomyopathy". Pediatr. Nephrol. 24 (12): 2459–62. doi:10.1007/s00467-009-1268-9. PMID 19653009. S2CID 22828959.
- Love, BA; Mehta, D; Fuster, VF (August 2008). "Evaluation and management of the adult patient with transposition of the great arteries following atrial-level (Senning or Mustard) repair". Nat Clin Pract Cardiovasc Med. 5 (8): 454–67. doi:10.1038/ncpcardio1252. PMID 18594551. S2CID 10491740.
- Tabori, NE; Love, BA (June 2008). "Transcatheter occlusion of pulmonary arteriovenous malformations using the Amplatzer Vascular Plug II". Catheterization and Cardiovascular Interventions. 71 (7): 940–3. doi:10.1002/ccd.21474. PMID 18412268. S2CID 34769371.
- Chaudhari, PR; Abergel, J; Warner, RR; et al. (August 2007). "Percutaneous closure of a patent foramen ovale in left-sided carcinoid heart disease". Nat Clin Pract Cardiovasc Med. 4 (8): 455–9. doi:10.1038/ncpcardio0944. PMID 17653118. S2CID 5574038.
- Dable, BK; Love, BA; Battaglia, TM; Booksh, KS; Lilley, MD; Marquardt, BJ (July 2006). "Characterization and quantitation of a tertiary mixture of salts by Raman spectroscopy in simulated hydrothermal vent fluid". Appl Spectrosc. 60 (7): 773–80. Bibcode:2006ApSpe..60..773D. doi:10.1366/000370206777887125. PMID 16854265. S2CID 44375254.
- Bar-Cohen, Y; Walsh, EP; Love, BA; Cecchin, F (October 2005). "First appropriate use of automated external defibrillator in an infant". Resuscitation. 67 (1): 135–7. doi:10.1016/j.resuscitation.2005.05.003. PMID 16146668.
- Marshall, AC; Love, BA; Lang, P; et al. (November 2003). "Staged repair of tetralogy of Fallot and diminutive pulmonary arteries with a fenestrated ventricular septal defect patch". J. Thorac. Cardiovasc. Surg. 126 (5): 1427–33. doi:10.1016/s0022-5223(03)01182-6. PMID 14666015.
