= Scott L. Friedman =

Scott L. Friedman, M.D.
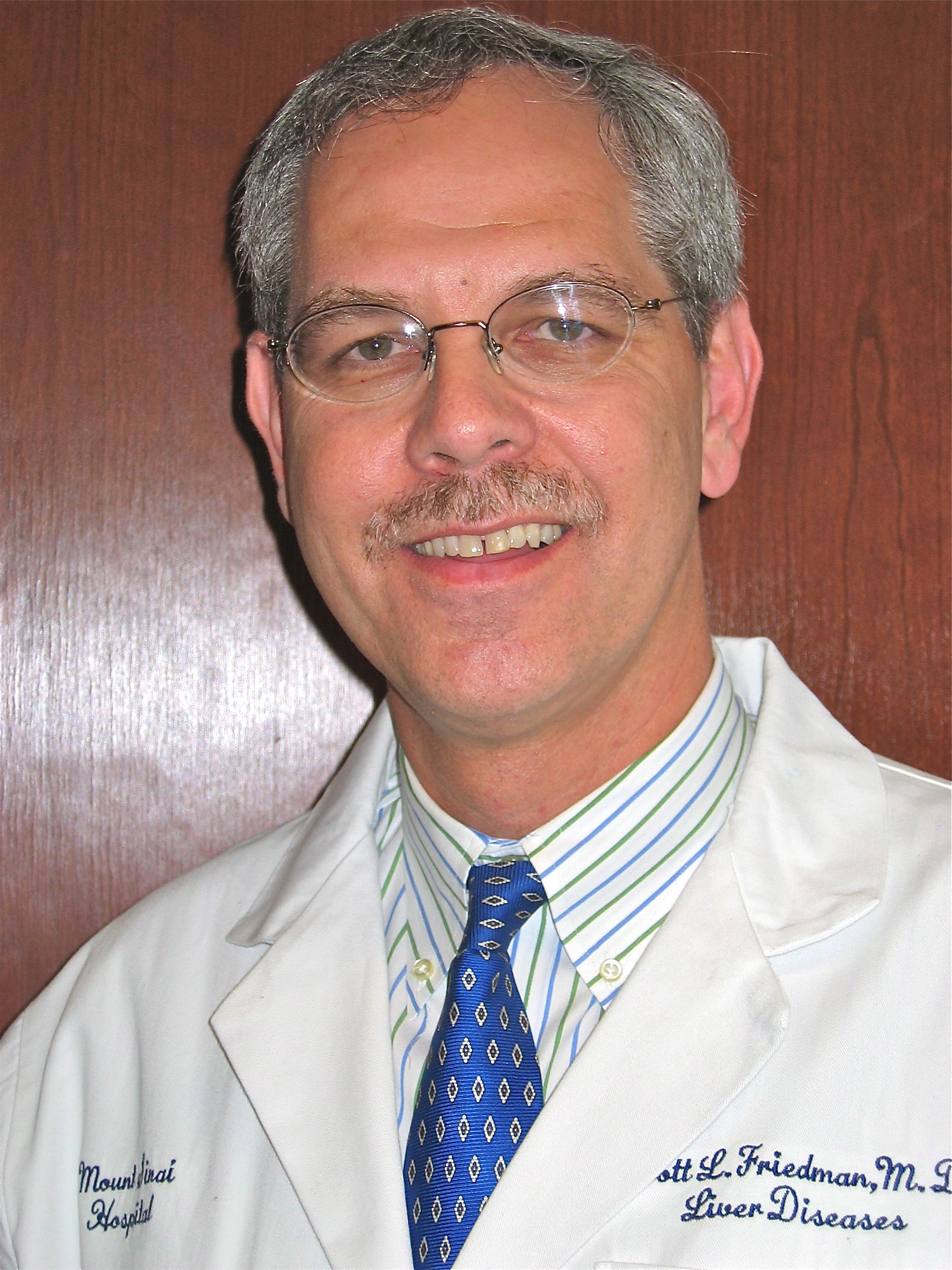
- Scientist, professor and physician in the field of liver diseases
- Born: June 13, 1955 (age 70)
- Education: Medical Degree, Mount Sinai School of Medicine, 1979; Residency in Internal Medicine, Beth Israel Hospital, Harvard Medical School, 1979-82; Fellowship in Gastroenterology and Liver Diseases, University of California, San Francisco School of Medicine, 1982-86; Fulbright Senior Scholar and Visiting Professor at the Weizmann Institute of Science in Israel, 1995-96
- Occupations: Fishberg Professor and Chief, Division of Liver Diseases, Mount Sinai School of Medicine
- Website: http://mssm.edu/profiles/scott-l-friedman

Scott L. Friedman (born June 13, 1955) is an American scientist, professor and physician who works in the field of hepatology. Friedman has conducted pioneering research into the underlying causes of scarring, or fibrosis, associated with chronic liver disease, by characterizing the key fibrogenic cell type, the hepatic stellate cell His laboratory has also discovered a novel tumor suppressor gene, KLF6 that is inactivated in a number of human cancers including primary liver cancer. Friedman is the Fishberg Professor of Medicine, and Chief of the Division of Liver Diseases, Mount Sinai School of Medicine in New York. Friedman has two children, a son, Leor Friedman, and a daughter, Yael Friedman.

== Early life and education ==
Friedman was born in Brooklyn, New York. His father was a medical doctor whose specialty was Radiology, and his mother was a high school business education teacher. His brother is Jeffrey M. Friedman. From the age of five, he grew up in North Woodmere on Long Island, NY and attended public schools in the Hewlett-Woodmere School District #14.

He attended Rensselaer Polytechnic Institute in Troy, New York, leaving at the end of his junior year to begin medical school at the Mount Sinai School of Medicine.

Friedman returned to Rensselaer in June 1976 and graduated cum laude with a BS degree, and he received his medical degree from Mount Sinai in 1979.

== Career ==
At age 24, Friedman began postgraduate training in Internal Medicine at the Beth Israel Hospital of Harvard Medical School in Boston, MA. Later he completed a fellowship in Gastroenterology and Liver Diseases at the University of California, San Francisco (UCSF) School of Medicine, where he was appointed to the faculty in 1986.

It was at UCSF that Friedman became the first scientist to isolate the hepatic stellate cell, which is responsible for hepatic fibrosis, a scarring process that can lead to cirrhosis of the liver.

In 1997, Friedman returned to the Mount Sinai School of Medicine where he has held the positions of Fishberg Professor of Medicine and Chief of the Division of Liver Diseases.

In 2003, Friedman received the International Hans Popper Award, given every 3 years to the most outstanding liver investigator worldwide under the age of 50. He assumed a major leadership role in the American Association for the Study of Liver Diseases (AASLD), serving as a Governing Board member (2005–2010) and President (2009).

Other achievements in hepatic research include authoring over 300 scientific articles; serving as a senior editor of the textbook, Current Diagnosis and Treatment in Gastroenterology; and conducting novel research in hepatic fibrosis.

== Research ==
Beginning in 1985 with Friedman's description of the role of the hepatic stellate cell in liver fibrosis, his laboratory at UCSF and then at Mount Sinai has conducted novel studies that have advanced the understanding of liver disease. These studies have been continuously funded by the National Institutes of Health for 25 years.

One of his laboratory's other key discoveries is a novel tumor suppressor gene, KLF6, which is inactivated in a number of human cancers, including primary liver cancer.

Friedman took a sabbatical in 1995 to become a Fulbright Senior Scholar at the Weizmann Institute in Israel, conducting research in the laboratory of Professor Moshe Oren.

He has authored over 300 scientific articles, and he has served as mentor to over 50 students, physicians, and postdoctoral trainees.

== Awards and Distinctions ==
- Faculty award, NIH,1986
- Arthur Aufses, Sr. Prize in Surgery, Mount Sinai School of Medicine, 1979
- Saul Horowitz, Jr. Outstanding Alumnus Award, Mount Sinai School of Medicine, 1993
- Fulbright Senior Scholar, Weizmann Institute of Science, Israel, 1995–1996
- International Hans Popper Award, The Falk Foundation, Freiburg, Germany, 2003
- Elected to the Association of American Physicians, 2004
- Castle Connally "Top Doctors" 2009; "Americaís Top Doctors", 2008 & 2010
