= Bernd Schröppel =

- Born: 1967 (age 58–59); Aulendorf, West Germany
- Education: University of Ulm
- Medical career
- Profession: nephrologist, transplant nephrologist
- Institutions: Mount Sinai Medical Center

Bernd Schröppel is a German former transplant nephrologist at the Mount Sinai Medical Center and the former medical director of the kidney pancreas transplant program at the Recanati/Miller Transplantation Institute at the Mount Sinai Medical Center in New York City. He is also a former assistant professor of nephrology at the Mount Sinai School of Medicine.

Schröppel is the author of three book chapters and 44 peer-reviewed articles. He is a member of the American Society of Nephrology and the American Society of Transplantation.

== Biography ==
Schröppel graduated with his medical degree in from the University of Ulm, Germany. He completed his residency training at Albert Einstein College of Medicine in New York, and his nephrology and transplant fellowship at Mount Sinai Hospital.

Schröppel's research interests are to characterize the innate immune response in transplantation and to identify therapeutic strategies to improve transplant survival. The other focus of his lab is to study molecular tools (SNP analysis, gene expression profiling, and differential expression of microRNA) to predict or detect complications (e.g. rejection, delayed graft function) after clinical transplantation. He was named medical director of Mount Sinai's kidney and pancreas transplant program in January 2009.

== Grants ==
- Principal investigator, contribution of toll-like receptor signaling in islet transplantation, NIH/NIAID
- Principal investigator, genetic and immune markers to predict HCV recurrence after liver transplantation. Prospective study in liver transplant recipients to identify genetic and molecular innate immune markers that predict HCV recurrence. American Society of Transplant Surgeons – Pfizer mid-level faculty award.

== Honors and awards ==
- 1994 Summa cum laude, University of Ulm, Germany
- 1997 Fesenius medical thesis research award of the University of Ulm, Germany
- 1998 Jan Brod research award of the University of Hannover, Germany
- 2005 American Society of Transplant Surgeons (ASTS) Vanguard Prize
- 2005 Norman S. Coplon Grant, Satellite Research Award
- 2007 Louis R. Wasserman Medical Scholar Career Development Award
- 2009 Dr. Harold and Golden Lamport Research Award
- 2010 ASTS – Pfizer mid-level faculty award

== Book chapters ==
- Schröppel B, Heeger P. Transplantation Immunology. In: Kidney Transplantation State of the Art. Hricik DE (Ed.). Second edition, London, UK: Remedica Group, 2007.
- Schröppel B, Akalin E. Transplant Immunology and Immunosuppression. In: Therapy in Nephrology and Hypertension: a companion to Brenner & Rector's The Kidney, Third Edition, by Christopher S. Wilcox, MD, published by Saunders, Elsevier Inc. 2008
- Gurkan S, Schröppel B, Murphy B. Immunology of Organ Transplantation. In: Pathology of Organ Transplantation, Springer 2011

== Publications ==
Partial list:

- Zhang N, Schröppel B, Lal G, Jakubzick C, Mao X, Chen D, Yin N, Jessberger R, Ochando JC, Ding Y, Bromberg JS. Regulatory T cells sequentially migrate from the site of tissue inflammation to the draining LN to suppress allograft rejection. Immunity, 30:458–469, 2009. PMID 19303390
- Krüger B, Krick S, Dhillon N, Lerner S, Ames S, Bromberg JS, Lin M, Walsh L, Vella J, Fischereder M, Krämer B, Colvin RB, Heeger P, Murphy B, Schröppel B. Donor Toll-like receptor 4 contributes to ischemia and reperfusion injury following human kidney transplantation. Proc Natl Acad Sci U S A, 106(9):3390–3395, 2009. PMID 19218437
- Ju W, Eichinger F, Bitzer M, Oh J, McWeeney S, Berthier CC, Shedden K, Cohen C, Henger A, Krick S, Kopp J, Stoeckert C, Dikman S, Schröppel B, Thomas D, Schlondorff D, Kretzler M, Bottinger E. Renal Gene and Protein Expression Signatures for Prediction of Kidney Disease Progression. Am J Pathol, 174(6):2073–85, 2009. PMID 19465643
- Rafiq MA, de Boccardo G, Schröppel B, Bromberg JS, Sehgal V, Dinavahi R, Murphy B, Akalin E. Differential outcomes in 3 types of acute antibody-mediated rejection. Clin Transplant. 2009. PMID 19624692
- Dhillon N, Liron W, Krüger B, Mehrotra A, Ward S, Godbold J, Radwan M, Schiano T, Murphy B, Schröppel B. Complement C3 allotypes and outcomes in liver transplantation. Liver Transplantation, 16:198–203, 2010. PMID 20104494
- Schröppel B, Krüger B, Walsh L, Harris S, Garrison K, Himmelfarb J, Lerner S, Bromberg J, Zhang P, Bonventre J, Wang Z, Farris A, Colvin R, Murphy B, Vella J, Tubular expression of KIM-1 does not predict delayed function after transplantation, J Am Soc Nephrol, 21:536–542, 2010. PMID 20019169
- Zhang N, Krüger B, Lal G, Luan Y, Yadav A, Zang W, Grimm M, Waaga-Gasser AM, Murphy B, Bromberg JS, Schröppel B. Inhibition of TLR4 signaling prolongs Treg-dependent murine islet allograft survival, Immunol Letters, 127:119–125, 2010. PMID 19879295
- Dhillon N, Walsh L, Krüger B, Ward SC, Godbold JH, Radwan M, Schiano T, Murphy BT, Schröppel B. A single nucleotide polymorphism of Toll-like receptor 4 identifies the risk of developing graft failure after liver transplantation. J Hepatology, in press. PMID 20400193
- Lin M, Yin N, Murphy B, Medof ME, Segerer S, Heeger PS, Schröppel B. Immune cell-derived c3 is required for autoimmune diabetes induced by multiple low doses of streptozotocin. Diabetes, 59(9):2247-52, 2010. PMID 20584999
- Krüger B, Yin N, Zhang N, Yadav A, Coward W, Lal G, Zang W, S Heeger P, Bromberg JS, Murphy B, Schröppel B. Islet-expressed TLR2 and TLR4 sense injury and mediate early graft failure after transplantation. Eur J Immunol, 40(10):2914-24, 2010. PMID 20809521
- Gurkan S, Luan Y, Dhillon N, Allam SA, Montague T, Bromberg JS, Ames S, Lerner S, Ebcioglu Z, Nair V, Dinavahi R, Sehgal V, Heeger P, Schröppel B, Murphy B. Immune reconstitution following rabbit antithymocyte globulin. Am J Trans 10:2132–2141, 2010 PMID 20883548
- Lal G, Yin N, Xu J, Lin M, Schröppel B, Ding Y, Marie I, Levy DE, Bromberg JS. Distinct inflammatory signals have physiologically divergent effects on epigenetic regulation of Foxp3 expression and Treg function, Am J Transplantation, 11(2):203–214, 2011. PMID 21219575
- Dinavahi R, George A, Tretin A, Akalin E, Ames S, Bromberg JS, DiPaola N, Lerner S, Mehrotra A, Murphy B, Nadasdy T, Arta E, Salomon DR, Schröppel B, Sehgal V, Sachidanandam R, Heeger P. Antibodies Reactive to Non-HLA Antigens in Transplant Glomerulopathy. JASN, in press
