= Roxana Mehran =

Cardiologist

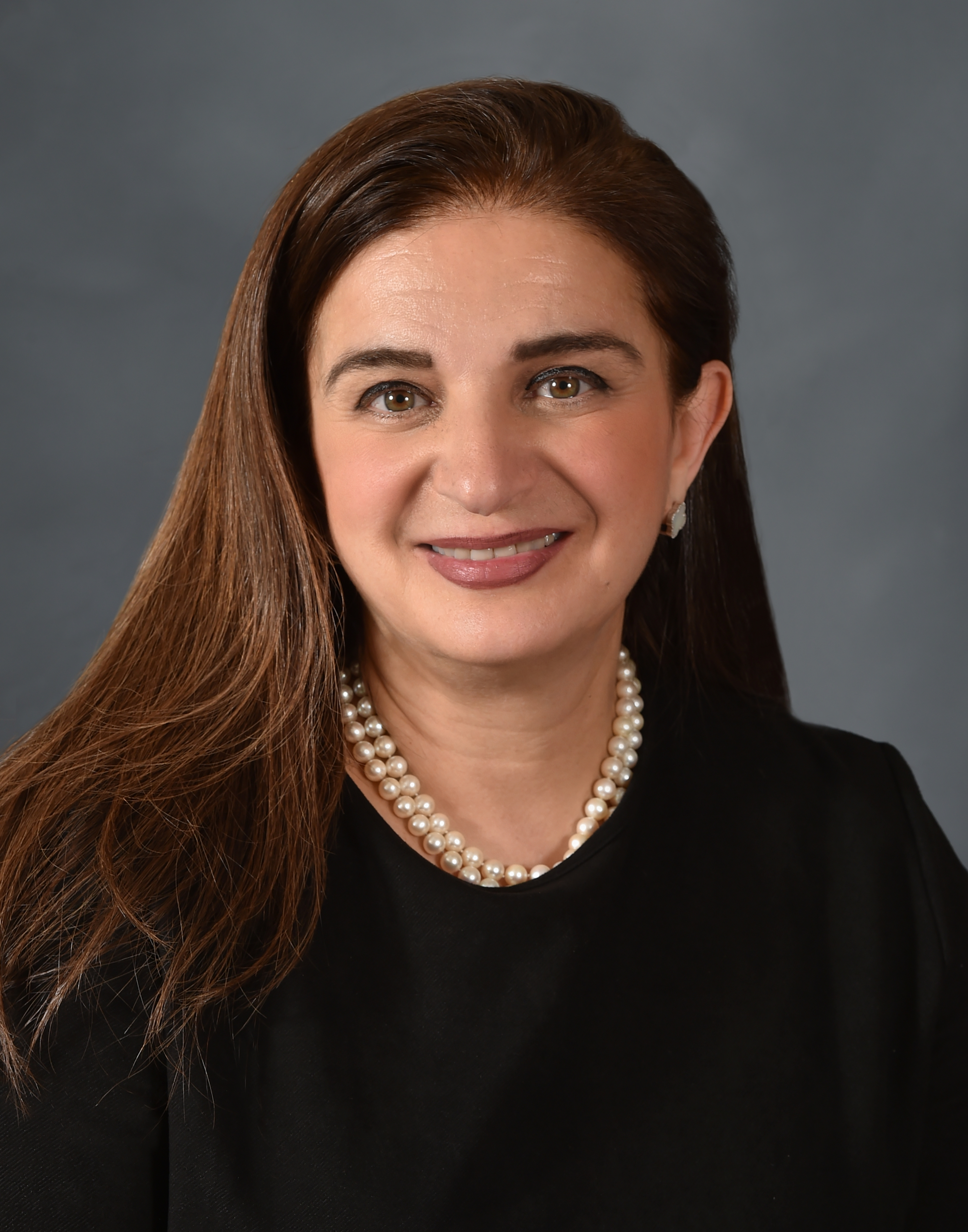
- Born: Tehran, Iran
- Education: New York University, (BS); St. George's University School of Medicine, (MD)
- Occupation: Interventional cardiologist
- Awards: Bernadine Healy Leadership in Women's CV Disease Distinguished Award (2017); Nanette Wenger Award for Excellence in Medical Leadership (2018); Andreas Gruntzig Award and Silver Medal of the European Society of Cardiology (2019); Ellis Island Medal of Honor (2019)

Roxana Mehran is an Iranian-American cardiologist and Mount Sinai Endowed Professor of Medicine at the Icahn School of Medicine at Mount Sinai. She is known for her work in interventional cardiology.

== Early life and education ==
Mehran was born in Tehran, Iran, before coming to the United States. She earned a bachelor's degree in chemistry from New York University in 1983. On October 26, 1983 she appeared on Nightline as a student present at St. George's University School of Medicine during the US led invasion of Grenada, West Indies. She earned her M.D. from St. George's University School of Medicine in 1987. From 1988 until 1991, Mehran completed her residency training in the internal medicine program at University of Connecticut School of Medicine in Hartford, CT, where she served as chief resident. She completed cardiology (1991 to 1994) and interventional cardiology (1994 until 1995) fellowships at Mount Sinai Medical Center in New York City.

== Medical career ==
Mehran held appointments at Columbia University Irving Medical Center and Washington Hospital Center before moving to Mount Sinai School of Medicine. As of 2021, she is a professor of medicine, cardiology, and population health science and policy at the Icahn School of Medicine at Mount Sinai, a position she has held since 2010. In 2019, she was honored as the Mount Sinai Professor in Cardiovascular Clinical Research and Outcomes.

Mehran advocates for women in medicine with a focus on her field of cardiology, including a study in The Lancet that showed a lack of gender-specific research related to women's heart health. In 2019 Mehran and Marie-Claude Morice co-founded Women as One, an organization dedicated to the advancement of women physicians, and in 2020, she was named lead commissioner for The Lancet's Commission on Women and Cardiovascular Disease. She was a founding physician of the Cardiovascular Research Foundation, New York City, in 2000. In July 2025, it was announced that Mehran would assume the role of president of the American College of Cardiology beginning in March 2026.

== Selected publications ==
As of 2021, Mehran has been cited over 200,000 times and has an h-index of 163.

- Mehran, R.; Nikolsky, E. (2006-04-01). "Contrast-induced nephropathy: Definition, epidemiology, and patients at risk". Kidney International. 69 (100): S11–S15. doi:10.1038/sj.ki.5000368. ISSN 0085-2538. PMID 16612394.
- Mehran, Roxana; Rao, Sunil V.; Bhatt, Deepak L.; Gibson, C. Michael; Caixeta, Adriano; Eikelboom, John; Kaul, Sanjay; Wiviott, Stephen D.; Menon, Venu; Nikolsky, Eugenia; Serebruany, Victor (2011-06-14). "Standardized Bleeding Definitions for Cardiovascular Clinical Trials". Circulation. 123 (23): 2736–2747. doi:10.1161/CIRCULATIONAHA.110.009449. PMID 21670242. S2CID 36243495.
- Mehran, Roxana; Aymong, Eve D.; Nikolsky, Eugenia; Lasic, Zoran; Iakovou, Ioannis; Fahy, Martin; Mintz, Gary S.; Lansky, Alexandra J.; Moses, Jeffrey W.; Stone, Gregg W.; Leon, Martin B. (2004). "A simple risk score for prediction of contrast-induced nephropathy after percutaneous coronary intervention". Journal of the American College of Cardiology. 44 (7): 1393–1399. doi:10.1016/j.jacc.2004.06.068. PMID 15464318.
- Mehran, Roxana; Dangas, George; Abizaid, Andrea S.; Mintz, Gary S.; Lansky, Alexandra J.; Satler, Lowell F.; Pichard, Augusto D.; Kent, Kenneth M.; Stone, Gregg W.; Leon, Martin B. (1999-11-02). "Angiographic Patterns of In-Stent Restenosis". Circulation. 100 (18): 1872–1878. doi:10.1161/01.CIR.100.18.1872. PMID 10545431.

== Awards and honors ==
- Bernadine Healy Leadership in Women's CV Disease Distinguished Award (2017)
- Master interventionalists of the Society for Cardiovascular Angiography & Interventions (2017)
- Nanette Wenger Award for Excellence in Medical Leadership (2018)
- Andreas Gruntzig Award and Silver Medal of the European Society of Cardiology (2019)
- Ellis Island Medal of Honor (2019)
