= Charles Schleien =

American pediatrician

- Born: December 31, 1953 (age 71); Washington, DC, USA

Charles Lawrence Schleien (born December 31, 1953) is an American pediatrician, the Philip Lanzkowsky Professor of Pediatrics and pediatrician-in-chief at Northwell Health as of May 1, 2012.

Previously, Schleien served as director of pediatric critical care medicine; professor of pediatrics and anesthesiology; and vice chair for administration, within the Department of Pediatrics at New York-Presbyterian Hospital.

== Biography ==
Schleien was born in Washington, D.C. He grew up in Flushing, New York.

He received his BA from Queens College, City University of New York in 1974 and his MD from the Mt. Sinai School Of Medicine in 1979. He did his pediatrics residency at Baylor College of Medicine/Texas Children's Hospital in Houston, Texas and Johns Hopkins University in Maryland which is also where he did his critical care fellowship and anesthesiology residency which he completed in 1985. He remained on the faculty at Hopkins until 1990.

He held NIH funding in pediatric CPR and areas of brain metabolism and blood flow.

In 1990 he became the division director at the University of Miami/Jackson Memorial Hospital Department of Pediatric Critical Care Medicine where he stayed until 1999, when he was recruited to Columbia University as division director of pediatric critical care medicine and Vice Chair of the Dept of Pediatrics.

In 2008, he received an MBA from the Columbia Business School.

In 2012 he became the chairman of pediatrics at Cohen Children's Medical Center, part of Northwell Health. Schleien is the executive director for Cohen Children's Medical Center, chairman of the Department of Pediatrics, senior vice president for the Pediatric Service Line, and Professor of Pediatrics at Hofstra Northwell School of Medicine.

Dr. Schleien wrote an opinion piece published by The New York Times about his experience with COVID-19. He had multiple media appearances including CNN, Good Morning America, CBS News, as well as reaching the front page of Reddit.

== Charity ==
Schleien is on the Board of Directors, Ronald McDonald House of Long Island.
