= Alfred Stern =

American television executive (1922–2013)

Alfred R. Stern
- Education: Deerfield Academy; University of North Carolina
- Employer(s): NBC; Warner Cable Corporation the Public Broadcasting System
- Known for: Cable television pioneer
- Board member of: Film Society of Lincoln Center; Center for Democracy Studies
- Children: 5
- Honours: Doctorate of Humane Letters, Mount Sinai School of Medicine

Alfred R. Stern (1922–2013) was an American cable television executive, media industry leader, and philanthropist. A grandson of Julius Rosenwald, the Sears, Roebuck and Company partner and Chicago philanthropist, Stern was an early advocate of cable television who served as vice president of NBC’s Enterprises Division, founded and chaired Television Communications Corporation, and later became president and chief executive officer of Warner Cable Corporation and senior vice president for corporate affairs at Warner Communications. He also served as chairman of the National Cable Television Association and chairman of the board of the Public Broadcasting System, and held a number of civic leadership roles including chairman of the board of Mount Sinai Hospital and chairman of the Film Society of Lincoln Center.

== Biography ==
Stern was the son of Marion Rosenwald and Alfred Kaufman Stern and he was the grandson of Julius Rosenwald, a Sears Roebuck partner and Chicago philanthropist. After his parents' divorce, his father, Alfred K. Stern, married writer Martha Dodd, daughter of United States ambassador to Germany William E. Dodd; the couple later left the United States and in 1957 were indicted in absentia on charges of conspiring to commit espionage on behalf of the Soviet Union, subsequently settling in Czechoslovakia and other parts of Eastern Europe, where they lived in exile for the remainder of their lives.

Stern served the United States Air Force during WWII after attending Deerfield Academy and the University of North Carolina. He was married to Joanne Stern, trustee of the Museum of Modern Art in New York City, and later Barbara Biben, a Gannett Co. executive. Stern’s children include Chris Hyman, Cathy Myers as well as Nicholas, Thomas and Margaret Stern, the 2006 Academy Award winner for best animated short.

== Career ==
=== Television ===
Stern was an early advocate of cable television. After serving as NBC’s Vice President, Enterprises Division (1952-1962), he started and chaired the Television Communications Corporation (1962-1975), focusing on cable. Time Warner acquired that company, and Stern took a position as President and CEO of Warner Cable Corporation and Senior Vice President, Corporate Affairs, Warner Communications, Inc (1975-1980). He also served as the Chairman of the National Cable Television Association, where he was named its "Man of the Year", and chairman of the board of directors of the Public Broadcasting System.

=== Other leadership roles ===
==== Chairmanships ====
Stern became a trustee of Mount Sinai Hospital in 1963 and then its Chairman of the Board (1977-1985), notably heading up a fund to build Mount Sinai campus’ 26-story Annenberg building. He received an honorary doctorate of Humane Letters from the Mount Sinai School of Medicine.

- Chairman of the Board of the Film Society of Lincoln Center
- Chairman of the Board of the Center for Democracy Studies

==== Trustee ====
- President, board of trustees, Dalton Schools
- Trustee, American Museum of Natural History
- Trustee, New York Public Library
- Trustee, WNET
- Trustee, White House Historical Association (with Barbara Biben)
- Trustee, Radcliffe College, 1979-1981
