= Aryeh Shander =

American physician

Aryeh Shander, MD, FCCM, FCCP is an anesthesiologist known for his work with bloodless procedures.

== Career ==
Shander is currently a Clinical Professor of Anesthesiology, Medicine and Surgery, Icahn School of Medicine at Mount Sinai and Chief of Department of Anesthesiology, Critical Care Medicine, Hyperbaric Medicine and Pain Management at Englewood Hospital and Medical Center. He is also Director of Research for TeamHealth Anesthesia

He has authored numerous articles and many books in the fields of anesthesiology, critical care, transfusion medicine and other disciplines. .

In 1997, Shander was recognized by Time magazine as one of America's "Heroes of Medicine."

== Memberships ==
- Fellow of the American College of Critical Care Medicine
- Fellow of the American College of Chest Physicians
- Founding member of the Society for the Advancement of Blood Management (SABM)
- Founding member of the American Society of Critical Care Anesthesiologists (ASCCA)
- Member of the American Association of Blood Banks (AABB)
- Member of the American Society of Anesthesiologists (ASA)
- Member of the Society of Critical Care Medicine (SCCM)
- Member of the National Anemia Action Council (NAAC)
