= Kristjan T. Ragnarsson =

Icelandic physiatrist (born 1943)

Kristjan T. Ragnarsson is an American physiatrist who focuses on the rehabilitation of individuals with disorders of the central nervous system. He is the Dr. Lucy G. Moses Professor and Chair of Rehabilitation Medicine at The Mount Sinai Medical Center in New York City.

Ragnarsson is the author of multiple book chapters and more than 100 articles. He was listed among New York Magazine’s Best Doctors of 2009 and among Castle Connolly's "Top Doctors in America" every year since 2002.

== Biography ==
Ragnarsson was born in 1943 in Reykjavík, Iceland. He graduated from the University of Iceland School of Medicine in 1969 and completed a residency in physical medicine and rehabilitation and a clinical research fellowship in spinal cord injury (SCI) medicine at the Rusk Institute of Rehabilitation Medicine at NYU. He was appointed to the faculty of the Department of Rehabilitation Medicine of the NYU School of Medicine in 1976 and served as director of the New York SCI Model System of Care from 1981 to 1986. In 1986, he was appointed Professor and Chair of the Department of Rehabilitation Medicine at The Mount Sinai Medical Center.

Ragnarsson served as president of the American Spinal Injury Association from 1993 to 1995. From 1995 to 1997 he served as president of The Mount Sinai Hospital Medical Board, and from 1997 until 2003 he chaired the Board of Governors of The Mount Sinai Faculty Practice Associates. He was a member of the board of the American Paraplegia Society from 1997 to 1999 and a member of the United States Department of Veterans' Affairs Scientific Merit Review Board from 1984 until 2000. In 1998, he chaired the National Institutes of Health consensus conference on "Rehabilitation of Persons with Traumatic Brain Injury." He has been a member of the American Medical Association since 1976. Currently he serves as President of the Association of Academic Psysiatrists and Vice President of the Foundation for Physical Medicine and Rehabilitation.

== Honors and awards ==
- American Spinal Injury Association (ASIA) Lifetime Achievement Award. Presented at joint meeting of ASIA and the International Spinal Cord Society. Vancouver, Canada, May 4, 2002.
- Ellis Island Medal of Honor, May 15, 2004
- Distinguished Member Award – American Academy of Physical Medicine and Rehabilitation, October 8, 2004
- Distinguished Public Service Award, American Academy of Physical Medicine and Rehabilitation. November 10, 2006.
- New York Super Doctors. Key Professional Media. Election by other physicians: Listed in The New York Times Magazine. 2008, 2009.

== Selected publications ==
- Ragnarsson, KT (April 2008). "Functional electrical stimulation after spinal cord injury: current use, therapeutic effects and future directions". Spinal Cord. 46: 255–74. doi:10.1038/sj.sc.3102091. PMID 17846639.
- Ragnarsson, KT (2006). "Traumatic brain injury research since the 1998 NIH Consensus Conference: accomplishments and unmet goals". J Head Trauma Rehabil. 21: 379–87. PMID 16983223.
- Bryce, TN; Dijkers, MP; Ragnarsson, KT; Stein, AB; Chen, B (2006). "Reliability of the Bryce/Ragnarsson spinal cord injury pain taxonomy". J Spinal Cord Med. 29: 118–32. PMC 1864801. PMID 16739555.
- Ragnarsson, KT; Wuermser, LA; Cardenas, DD; Marino, RJ (November 2005). "Spinal cord injury clinical trials for neurologic restoration: improving care through clinical research". Am J Phys Med Rehabil. 84: S77–97, quiz S98–100. PMID 16251838.
- Pollack, SF; Ragnarsson, KT; Dijkers, M; Djikers, M (2004). "The effect of electrically induced lower extremity ergometry on an ischial pressure ulcer: a case study". J Spinal Cord Med. 27: 143–7. PMID 15162886.
- Wood-Dauphinée, S; Exner, G; Bostanci, B; et al. (2002). "Quality of life in patients with spinal cord injury--basic issues, assessment, and recommendations". Restor. Neurol. Neurosci. 20: 135–49. PMID 12454362.
- Ragnarsson, KT (2002). "Results of the NIH consensus conference on "rehabilitation of persons with traumatic brain injury"". Restor. Neurol. Neurosci. 20: 103–8. PMID 12454359.
- Thomas, DC; Kreizman, IJ; Melchiorre, P; Ragnarsson, KT (July 2002). "Rehabilitation of the patient with chronic critical illness". Crit Care Clin. 18: 695–715. PMID 12140920.
- Ragnarsson, KT (May 2000). "Diagnosis and Treatment of Traumatic Brain Injury". JAMA. 283: 2392. PMID 10815080.
- Bryce, TN; Ragnarsson, KT (February 2000). "Pain after spinal cord injury". Phys Med Rehabil Clin N Am. 11: 157–68. PMID 10680163.
- Eastwood, EA; Hagglund, KJ; Ragnarsson, KT; Gordon, WA; Marino, RJ (November 1999). "Medical rehabilitation length of stay and outcomes for persons with traumatic spinal cord injury--1990-1997". Arch Phys Med Rehabil. 80: 1457–63. PMID 10569441.
- Ragnarsson, KT (May 1999). "Physical medicine and rehabilitation at the Mount Sinai medical center during the 20th century". Mt. Sinai J. Med. 66: 139–44. PMID 10377544.
- Ragnarsson, KT (October 1998). "Restorative treatment of persons with spinal cord injury: current trends". J Rehabil Res Dev. 35: xi–xiv. PMID 10220214.
- Inslicht, DV; Stein, AB; Pomerantz, F; Ragnarsson, KT (Apr 1998). "Three women with lupus transverse myelitis: case reports and differential diagnosis". Arch Phys Med Rehabil. 79 (4): 456–9. PMID 9552115.
