= Mount Sinai Journal of Medicine =

- Discipline: Medicine
- Language: English
- Edited by: C. Warren Olanow

Publication details
- History: 1934-2012
- Publisher: John Wiley & Sons for the Mount Sinai School of Medicine (United States)
- Frequency: Bimonthly

Standard abbreviations
- ISO 4: Mt. Sinai J. Med.

Indexing
- CODEN: MSJMAZ
- ISSN: 0027-2507 (print); 1931-7581 (web)
- OCLC no.: 01758779

Links
- Journal homepage; Online access; Online archive

The Mount Sinai Journal of Medicine is a peer-reviewed medical journal that was published continually between 1934 and 2012 by the Mount Sinai Hospital, New York, later by the Mount Sinai School of Medicine.

The journal is issued six times a year and contains clinical articles from all medical disciplines. In January 2007, John Wiley & Sons assumed publishing responsibilities and re-launched the journal as Mount Sinai Journal of Medicine: A Journal of Translational and Personalized Medicine, the focus being on the evolving nature of clinical care.
