= David H. Adams =

American cardiac surgeon

- Occupation: Cardiothoracic Surgeon
- Employer: Mount Sinai Hospital
- Title: Marie-Josée and Henry R. Kravis Professor and Chairman

David H. Adams is an American cardiac surgeon and the Marie-Josée and Henry R. Kravis Professor and Chairman of the Department of Cardiothoracic Surgery, Icahn School of Medicine at Mount Sinai Hospital in New York City.

Dr. Adams is a recognized leader in the field of heart valve surgery and mitral valve reconstruction. As director of Mount Sinai Mitral Valve Repair Center, he has set national benchmarks with >99% degenerative mitral valve repair rates, while running one of the largest valve repair programs in the United States. Dr. Adams is the co-inventor of 2 mitral valve annuloplasty repair rings – the Carpentier-McCarthy-Adams IMR ETlogix Ring and the Carpentier-Edwards Physio II Annuloplasty Ring, and is a senior consultant with royalty agreements with Edwards Lifesciences. He is also the inventor of the Tri-Ad Adams Tricuspid Annuloplasty ring with a royalty agreement with Medtronic. He is a co-author with Professor Alain Carpentier of the benchmark textbook in mitral valve surgery Carpentier's Reconstructive Valve Surgery. He is also the National Co-Principal Investigator of the FDA pivotal trial of the Medtronic-CoreValve transcatheter aortic valve replacement device.

== Biography ==
Adams is a cardiac surgeon at Mount Sinai Hospital in New York City, specializing in mitral valve repair. He is the author of over 800 publications (as of April 2020), holds three patents (Patent number 7.959.673, 6.660.265 and 6.540.781) and is recognized as a leading surgeon scientist and medical expert, serving on the Editorial Boards of several medical journals, including The Annals of Thoracic Surgery and The Annals of Cardiothoracic Surgery. Adams is a highly sought speaker both nationally and internationally, and has developed one of the world's largest video libraries of techniques in valve reconstruction. He is co-director of the annual American College of Cardiology/American Association for Thoracic Surgery (AATS) Heart Valve Disease Summit, and the Director of the biennial AATS Mitral Conclave. He received his undergraduate and medical education at Duke University and completed his internship and residency in general and cardiothoracic surgery at Brigham and Women's Hospital and at Harvard Medical School. Adams followed that with a fellowship in the Cardiothoracic Unit at Harefield Hospital in London under Professor Sir Magdi Yacoub. In addition, he completed a two-year research fellowship under Professor Morris Karnovsky in the Department of Pathology at Harvard Medical School. He later served at Brigham and Women's Hospital as the Associate Chief of Cardiac Surgery and Director of the Brigham Primate Xeno-transplant Laboratory. He has been Chairman of the Department of Cardiothoracic Surgery at Mount Sinai Hospital since 2002.

== Scientific investigator ==
Adams' clinical interests include all aspects of heart valve surgery, with a special emphasis on mitral valve reconstruction.

=== Areas of research ===
Adams' major research interests include:

- Investigation of Ischemic Mitral Regurgitation
- Outcomes Related to Mitral Valve Repair
- Novel Mitral Valve Repair Strategies

Past research honors include the Alton Ochsner Research Scholarship from the American Association for Thoracic Surgery and the Paul Dudley White Research Fellowship from the American Heart Association. He has also received honorary Professorships from Capital University in Beijing and Keio University in Tokyo.

== Medical 'miracle' ==
In 2005 New York Magazine featured Adams as having performed "Medical Miracle #7" when, in 2004, he performed mitral valve surgery on actress Liana Pai, who was then six months pregnant with her first child.

Immediate surgery was required to address Pai's aggressive bacterial infection. A conventional surgical procedure – arresting the heart during the operation, using a heart-and-lung machine, and following up with a regime of anti-clotting drugs – would have terminated the actress's pregnancy. With an incision across Pai's breast bone, Adams drained blood from her heart into a reservoir where it could be oxygenated before being returned to the aorta. In the meantime, he replaced two valves, both too badly damaged to attempt reconstruction with time limited by lack of a heart-and-lung machine, with compatible organic tissue – thereby eliminating the need for pregnancy-prohibiting anti-clotting drugs post-surgery.

"I was glad to be alive, of course, but until my baby was born, I wouldn't believe everything was okay... Ima came out perfect and healthy. She's healthy, headstrong, independent. Adams saved two lives at once."

== Awards and honors ==
- 2009 Heart of New York Award for Achievement in Cardiovascular Science and Medicine, American Heart Association
- Featured in New York Magazine's list of Best Doctors in 2002–2009 and as one of the "Top 100 Minimally Invasive Surgeons" in 2006.
- 2002 Marie-Josée and Henry R. Kravis Endowed Professor of Cardiothoracic Surgery, Mount Sinai School of Medicine
- 2001 Best Oral Presentation, International Society for Minimally Invasive Cardiac Surgery
- 2000 Honorary Professor of Surgery, Capital University of Medical Sciences, Beijing
- 1992 Alton Ochsner Research Scholar, The American Association for Thoracic Surgery
- 1987 National Research Service Award, National Institutes of Health
- 1986 Paul Dudley White Fellow, American Heart Association
- 1986 Research Fellowship Award, American Heart Association
- 1981 Alpha Omega Alpha
- 1981 International College of Surgeons Scholarship

== Inventor ==
- Carpentier A, Adams DH, Adzich, WV. Degenerative valvular disease specific annuloplasty ring sets, Patent filed with U.S. Patent and Trademark Office March 16, 2012
- Carpentier A, McCarthy P, Adams DH. Carpentier-McCarthy-Adams IMR ETlogix Annuloplasty Ring. Edwards Lifesciences Corporation, Irvine, CA 2004.
- Chen RH, Adams DH. Fresh, cryopreserved, or minimally fixed cardiac valvular xenografts. Patent filed with the U.S. Patent and Trademark Office October 16, 2000.
- Adams DH. Cryopreserved homografts having natural tissue sewing rings. Patent filed with the U.S. Patent and Trademark Office January 27, 1999.

== Peer-reviewed articles ==
Partial list:

- Adams DH, Anyanwu AC, Chikwe J, Filsoufi F (June 2009). "The year in cardiovascular surgery". Journal of the American College of Cardiology. 53 (25): 2389–403. doi:10.1016/j.jacc.2009.02.061. PMID 19539151.
- Adams DH, Anyanwu AC (May 2009). "Valve Disease: Asymptomatic mitral regurgitation: does surgery save lives?". Nature Reviews Cardiology. 6 (5): 330–2. doi:10.1038/nrcardio.2009.50. PMID 19377493. S2CID 35849404.
- Nemirovsky D, Salzberg SP, Einstein AJ, et al. (December 2006). "Multimodal characterization of a large right atrial mass after surgical repair of an atrial septal defect". Mt. Sinai J. Med. 73 (8): 1117–9. PMID 17285207.
- Adams DH, Anyanwu AC (September 2008). "Seeking a higher standard for degenerative mitral valve repair: begin with etiology". The Journal of Thoracic and Cardiovascular Surgery. 136 (3): 551–6. doi:10.1016/j.jtcvs.2007.10.060. PMID 18805250.
- Adams DH, Anyanwu AC, Sugeng L, Lang RM (May 2008). "Degenerative mitral valve regurgitation: surgical echocardiography". Current Cardiology Reports. 10 (3): 226–32. doi:10.1007/s11886-008-0038-9. PMID 18489867. S2CID 39012773.
- Akins CW, Miller DC, Turina MI, et al. (April 2008). "Guidelines for reporting mortality and morbidity after cardiac valve interventions". The Annals of Thoracic Surgery. 85 (4): 1490–5. doi:10.1016/j.athoracsur.2007.12.082. PMID 18355567.
- Love BA, Fischer GW, Mittnacht A, Kalman J, Adams DH (March 2010). "Transcatheter repair of perivalvular regurgitation". Semin Cardiothorac Vasc Anesth. 14 (1): 68–72. doi:10.1177/1089253210364064. PMID 20472633. S2CID 206683295.
- Adams DH, Anyanwu AC (March 2008). "The cardiologist's role in increasing the rate of mitral valve repair in degenerative disease". Current Opinion in Cardiology. 23 (2): 105–10. doi:10.1097/HCO.0b013e3282f4fe47. PMID 18303521. S2CID 38052565.
- Anyanwu AC, Adams DH (2007). "Etiologic classification of degenerative mitral valve disease: Barlow's disease and fibroelastic deficiency". Seminars in Thoracic and Cardiovascular Surgery. 19 (2): 90–6. doi:10.1053/j.semtcvs.2007.04.002. PMID 17870001. S2CID 1200887.Anyanwu AC, Adams DH (June 2007). "The intraoperative "ink test": a novel assessment tool in mitral valve repair". The Journal of Thoracic and Cardiovascular Surgery. 133 (6): 1635–6. doi:10.1016/j.jtcvs.2007.01.035. PMID 17532968.
- Anyanwu AC, Filsoufi F, Salzberg SP, Bronster DJ, Adams DH (November 2007). "Epidemiology of stroke after cardiac surgery in the current era". The Journal of Thoracic and Cardiovascular Surgery. 134 (5): 1121–7. doi:10.1016/j.jtcvs.2007.06.031. PMID 17976438.Adams DH, Anyanwu AC, Rahmanian PB, Abascal V, Salzberg SP, Filsoufi F (December 2006). "Large annuloplasty rings facilitate mitral valve repair in Barlow's disease". The Annals of Thoracic Surgery. 82 (6): 2096–100, discussion 2101. doi:10.1016/j.athoracsur.2006.06.043. PMID 17126117.
- Filsoufi F, Rahmanian PB, Anyanwu A, Adams DH (2006). "Physiologic basis for the surgical treatment of ischemic mitral regurgitation". The American Heart Hospital Journal. 4 (4): 261–8. doi:10.1111/j.1541-9215.2006.05932.x. PMID 17086006. S2CID 6030427.
- Adams DH, Anyanwu AC, Rahmanian PB, Filsoufi F (September 2006). "Current concepts in mitral valve repair for degenerative disease". Heart Failure Reviews. 11 (3): 241–57. doi:10.1007/s10741-006-0103-7. PMID 17041764. S2CID 13489415.
- Daimon M, Fukuda S, Adams DH, et al. (July 2006). "Mitral valve repair with Carpentier-McCarthy-Adams IMR ETlogix annuloplasty ring for ischemic mitral regurgitation: early echocardiographic results from a multi-center study". Circulation. 114 (1 Suppl): I588–93. doi:10.1161/CIRCULATIONAHA.105.001347. PMID 16820643.
- Adams DH, Anyanwu A (March 2006). "Pitfalls and limitations in measuring and interpreting the outcomes of mitral valve repair". The Journal of Thoracic and Cardiovascular Surgery. 131 (3): 523–9. doi:10.1016/j.jtcvs.2005.11.033. PMID 16515900.
- Salzberg SP, Filsoufi F, Anyanwu A, et al. (August 2005). "High-risk mitral valve surgery: perioperative hemodynamic optimization with nesiritide (BNP)". The Annals of Thoracic Surgery. 80 (2): 502–6. doi:10.1016/j.athoracsur.2005.02.041. PMID 16039193.
- Vassiliades TA, Block PC, Cohn LH, et al. (May 2005). "The clinical development of percutaneous heart valve technology: a position statement of the Society of Thoracic Surgeons (STS), the American Association for Thoracic Surgery (AATS), and the Society for Cardiovascular Angiography and Interventions (SCAI)". The Annals of Thoracic Surgery. 79 (5): 1812–8. doi:10.1016/j.athoracsur.2005.02.062. PMID 15854994.
- Filsoufi F, Salzberg SP, Adams DH (March 2005). "Current management of ischemic mitral regurgitation". The Mount Sinai Journal of Medicine. 72 (2): 105–15. PMID 15770340. Archived from the original on May 6, 2009.
- Adams DH, Filsoufi F (June 2003). "Another chapter in an enlarging book: repair degenerative mitral valves". The Journal of Thoracic and Cardiovascular Surgery. 125 (6): 1197–9. doi:10.1016/S0022-5223(03)00576-2. PMID 12830033.
