= Mount Sinai Kravis Children's Hospital =

Pediatric hospital in Manhattan, New York

- Mount Sinai Kravis Children's Hospital in 2026

Geography
- Location: 1184 Fifth Avenue, Manhattan, New York City, New York, United States
- Coordinates: 40.790093°N 73.953920°W

Organization
- Care system: Private
- Type: Children's teaching hospital
- Affiliated university: Icahn School of Medicine at Mount Sinai

Services
- Emergency department: Pediatric

Links
- Website: www.mountsinai.org/locations/kravis-childrens
- Lists: Hospitals in New York State

Mount Sinai Kravis Children's Hospital is a pediatric hospital located within the Mount Sinai Hospital campus in Manhattan, New York City. It is part of the Mount Sinai Health System and is affiliated with the Icahn School of Medicine at Mount Sinai. Kravis operates as a tertiary pediatric care center, providing inpatient, emergency, intensive care, neonatal and pediatric subspecialty services.

The hospital includes a 15-bed pediatric intensive care unit and a 46-bed, Level IV neonatal intensive care unit. Mount Sinai Hospital is designated a Regional Perinatal Center by the New York State Department of Health. In the 2025–26 edition of the U.S. News & World Report Best Children's Hospitals rankings, Kravis was nationally ranked in pediatric diabetes and endocrinology, gastroenterology and gastrointestinal surgery, and nephrology.

== History ==
Pediatric medicine at Mount Sinai developed under the care of physician Abraham Jacobi, who established the hospital's first children's ward. Mount Sinai dates the establishment of its Department of Pediatrics to 1878. Jacobi became known as the father of American pediatrics and had previously been appointed the first professor of pediatrics at a United States medical school.

In 1988, investor Henry R. Kravis donated $10 million to Mount Sinai to establish a children's hospital. The hospital was subsequently named for him.

In 2015, Mount Sinai and the Children's Hospital of Philadelphia formed an alliance that initially focused on pediatric oncology. The institutions said that cardiac care and fetal-medicine programs would follow. The alliance expanded in 2017 with the establishment of a joint fetal-medicine program and plans for a children's heart center.

During the initial wave of the COVID-19 pandemic in New York City in 2020, Kravis admitted some adult patients to increase hospital capacity. Pediatric physicians also worked in adult intensive-care units elsewhere at Mount Sinai.

In November 2020, Dwayne Johnson and Microsoft donated custom Xbox Series X consoles to Kravis and 19 other children's hospitals in the United States.

In April 2022, Mount Sinai opened a redesigned children's emergency department. The facility was nearly twice the size of the previous pediatric emergency space, had increased bed capacity, and was separated from the adult emergency department. It included a pediatric resuscitation area and a low-stimulation room for children with autism or other sensory needs. The project was part of a five-phase, $70 million reconstruction of The Mount Sinai Hospital's emergency department.

Other renovations in 2022 included a pediatric inpatient wing and a surgical admitting area. Also in 2022, the Jack Martin Fund donated $3.5 million to establish a 2,400-square-foot child and adolescent imaging center at Kravis to support pediatric radiology, cancer care and research.

In December 2025, Russell Wilson, then a quarterback for the New York Giants, and his wife, singer Ciara, announced a $3 million contribution to Kravis through their Why Not You Foundation. The funding was designated for new therapeutic play and creative arts spaces for pediatric patients, as well as upgrades to a common area known as "The Zone."

== Facilities and services ==
Kravis operates as a children's hospital within the larger Mount Sinai Hospital complex. Its pediatric intensive care unit treats patients from infancy through age 21 and works with a pediatric cardiac intensive care unit. The pediatric ICU has 15 beds and admits approximately 1,200 patients annually.

The Jo Carole and Ronald S. Lauder Newborn Intensive Care Unit is a 46-bed Level IV Regional Perinatal Center. It treats approximately 1,000 newborns each year, including infants transferred from other hospitals in the region.

The children's emergency department is connected to the hospital's inpatient and specialty services. The emergency department's 2022 redesign created separate facilities for pediatric patients and expanded its capacity for both lower-acuity and critical-care cases.

Mount Sinai reported in 2024 that it had introduced a pediatric-specific transport team and ambulance program, a specialized pediatric vascular-access team, and a separate preoperative registration area for children.

Among the hospital's child-life programs is KidZone TV, an interactive in-house television studio in which patients can participate in live programs from the studio or their hospital rooms.

== Clinical network and partnerships ==
In 2022, Kravis and Valley Health System announced a partnership to expand pediatric specialty services in northern New Jersey. The organizations opened their first joint general and specialty pediatrics practice in Montvale, New Jersey, in October 2022. The practice combined general pediatrics with services including cardiology, allergy, developmental pediatrics, endocrinology, diabetes care and nutrition.

A second Valley–Mount Sinai children's health practice opened in Wayne, New Jersey, in 2026. The practice initially offered pediatric primary care, with specialty services planned for the location.

== Recognition ==
In the 2025–26 U.S. News & World Report Best Children's Hospitals rankings, Kravis ranked No. 32 nationally in pediatric diabetes and endocrinology, No. 40 in gastroenterology and gastrointestinal surgery, and tied for No. 50 in nephrology.

== In popular culture ==
The hospital and its physicians appeared in "Second Opinions," the second episode of the 2019 Netflix documentary series Diagnosis. The episode followed a seven-year-old girl with Rasmussen's encephalitis whose family sought an alternative to a proposed hemispherectomy. She later underwent surgery to implant an electrical device intended to help control her seizures.

In December 2019, then-LSU quarterback Joe Burrow visited Kravis the day after winning the Heisman Trophy, meeting with pediatric patients including a 13-year-old youth football player from New York City.

Later that month, the hospital was featured in a MrBeast video titled "Giving 10,000 Presents To Kids For Christmas," in which donated Christmas presents were distributed to children at the hospital.

== See also ==
- List of children's hospitals in the United States
- Mount Sinai Hospital
- Morgan Stanley Children's Hospital
