= Beth Israel Medical Center =

Former teaching hospital in New York, New York

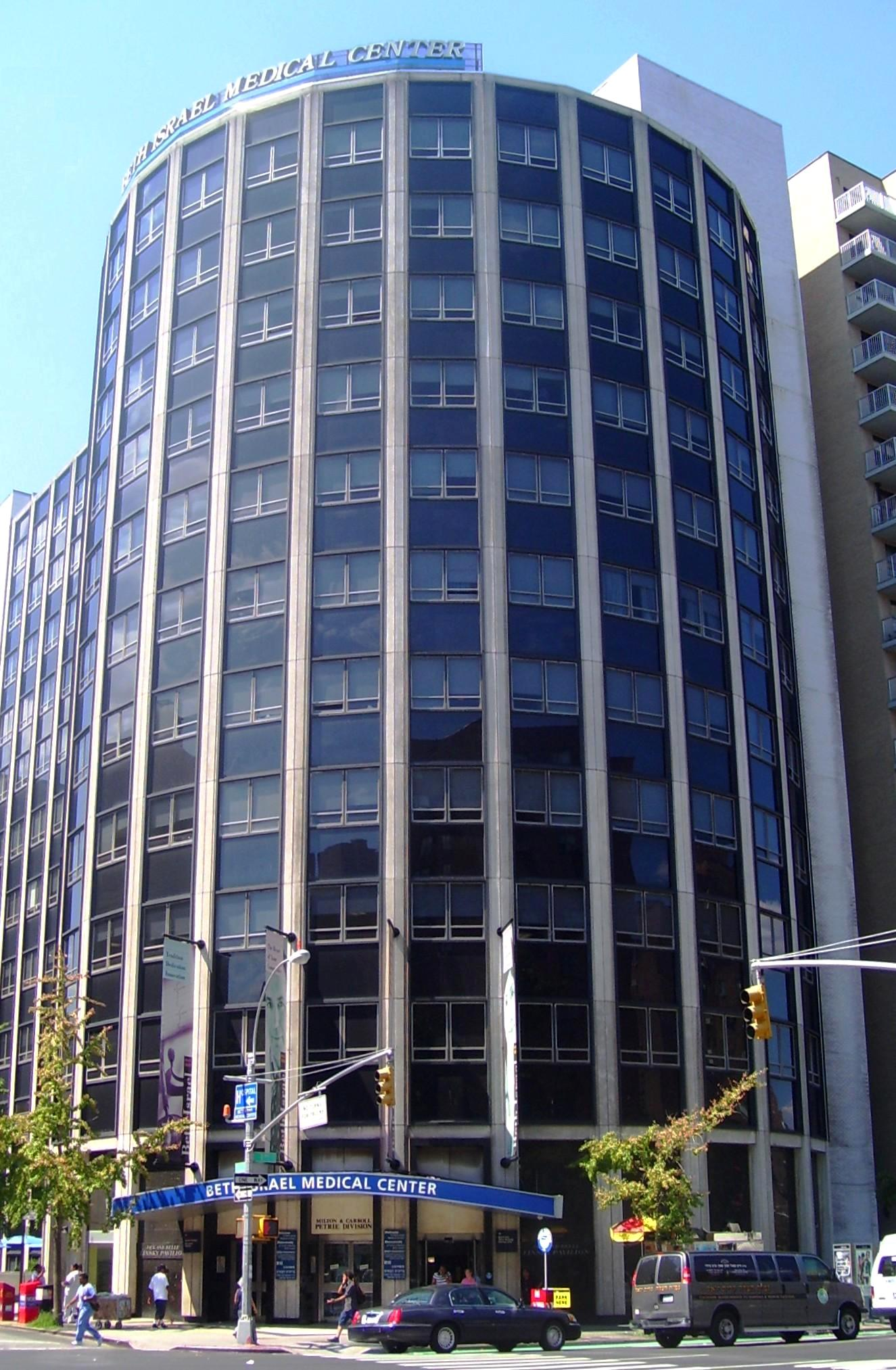
- Jack and Belle Linsky Pavilion of the Petrie Division, as seen in 2010

Geography
- Location: First Avenue and 16th Street, New York, New York, United States
- Coordinates: 40.7335°N 73.9826°W

Organization
- Type: Teaching
- Affiliated university: University and Bellevue Hospital Medical College; New York University College of Medicine; Mount Sinai School of Medicine; Albert Einstein College of Medicine of Yeshiva University; St. George's University; Phillips Beth Israel School of Nursing; Icahn School of Medicine at Mount Sinai
- Network: Continuum Health Partners; Mount Sinai Health System

Services
- Emergency department: Yes
- Beds: 1,368 (2008); 799 (2017)

History
- Founded: 1889
- Closed: 2025

Links
- Website: www.mountsinai.org/locations/beth-israel
- Lists: Hospitals in New York State
- Other links: Hospitals in Manhattan

Beth Israel Medical Center was a large, full-service tertiary teaching hospital in New York City. Originally dedicated to serving immigrant Jews living in the tenement slums of the Lower East Side of Manhattan, it was founded at the turn of the 20th century as Beth Israel Hospital. As such, the hospital quickly became part of the social structure of the area. It existed in a couple of locations before settling at First Avenue and 16th Street facing Stuyvesant Square.

Other campuses included the Beth Israel-Kings Highway Division in Brooklyn and Phillips Ambulatory Care Center at Union Square. It had a number of different affiliations with medical schools over the years as well as founding the still-active Beth Israel School of Nursing. It became known as Beth Israel Medical Center in 1965, during various expansion efforts such as purchasing Manhattan General Hospital the year prior. At its peak it had some 1,368 beds.

Beth Israel Medical Center became a member of the Continuum Health Partners hospital network in the late 1990s. It then became a member of the Mount Sinai Health System, a nonprofit health system formed in 2013 by the merger of Continuum and The Mount Sinai Medical Center, and at that point became known as Mount Sinai Beth Israel. Subsequently, Mount Sinai officials announced they would close Beth Israel, saying most of its beds were empty and it was losing on average $100 million a year, but community organizations opposed the action. Following a decision in the courts, Beth Israel closed in April 2025.

== Beth Israel Hospital ==
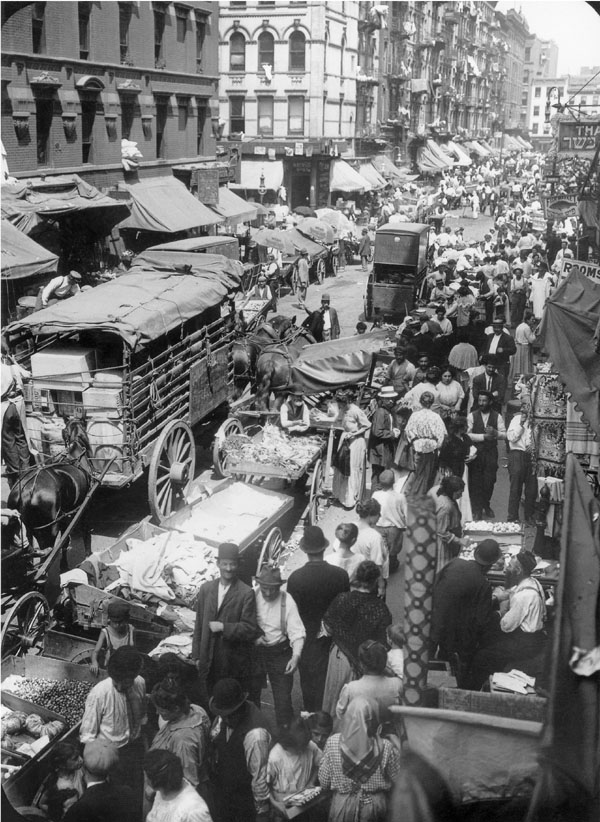
Lower East Side scene c. 1903, near where Beth Israel Hospital was founded

The history began in 1889 when the Beth Israel Hospital Association was formed. The entity was subsequently incorporated as Beth Israel Hospital on May 28, 1890, by a group of 40 Orthodox Jews on the Lower East Side of Manhattan, each of whom paid 25 cents to set up a hospital dedicated to serving immigrant Jews living in the tenement slums of the Lower East Side. Beth Israel is Hebrew for "House of Israel", and it was one of the common names being given to Jewish hospitals across the United States.

At the time, waves of Jewish immigrants were coming from Russia and Eastern Europe and crowding into the Lower East Side, which was becoming one of the places on the globe the most packed with people; as such the environs were suspectable to all sorts of diseases, especially tuberculosis. However the population wanted not just any medical providers, but ones who would provide kosher food and follow other cultural and religious customs and regulations. It was also valuable to have doctors who spoke Yiddish. There was already a hospital in existence for several decades that provided for poor Jewish patients, The Mount Sinai Hospital further uptown, but the unadapted new arrivals from Russia are said to have found it an unwelcoming place.

The new association saw its first physical manifestation during 1890 on Henry Street, where a dispensary was opened. Then in 1891 when the initial Beth Israel Hospital was opened, along East Broadway. It was big enough for twenty patients. Another short relocation followed, along East Broadway adjacent to Division Street, in 1892. There a pair of buildings were rented, that between them had space for thirty-four beds.

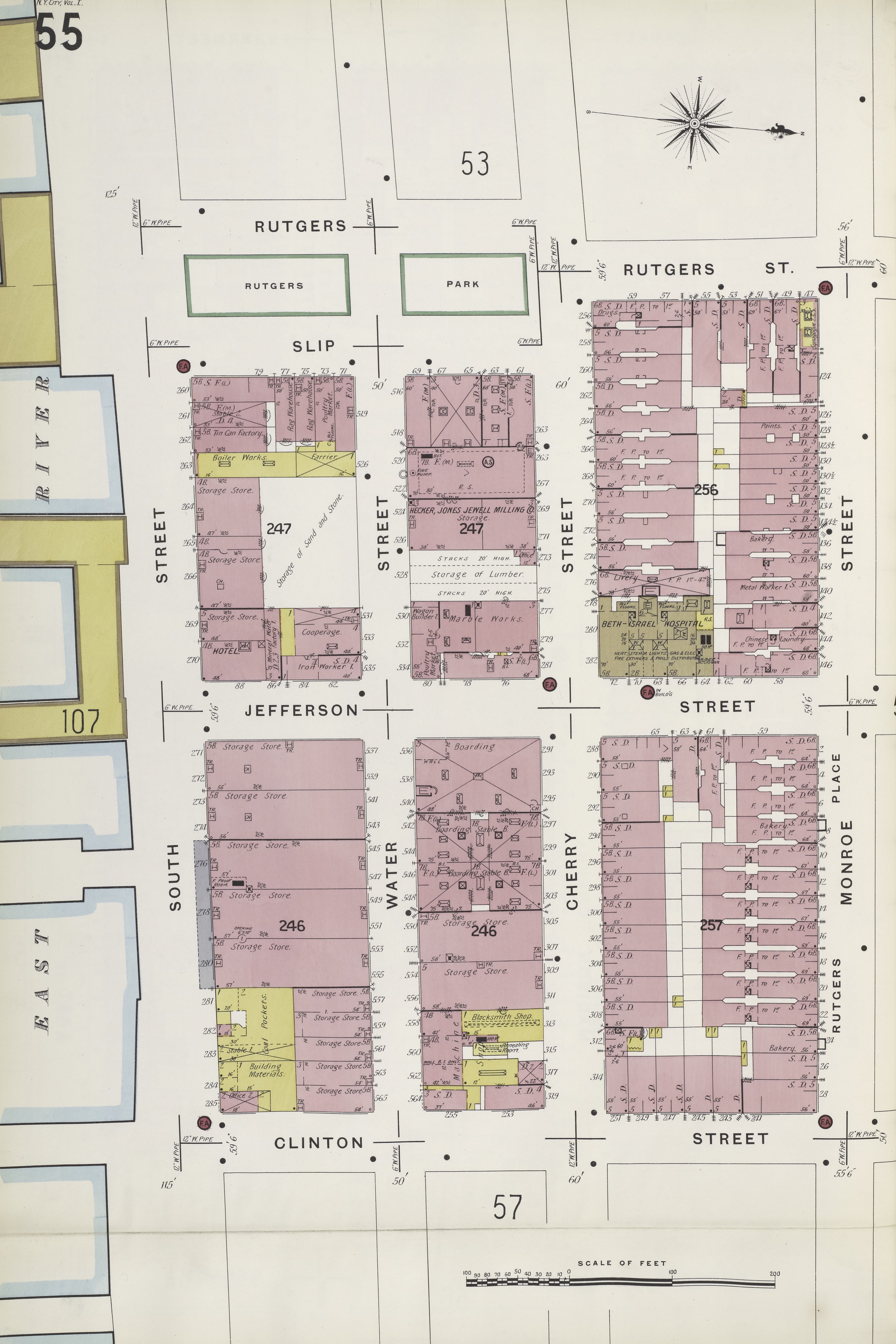
Buildings map from 1905 show the location of Beth Israel Hospital at the corner of Jefferson and Cherry Streets (brown coloring, center right) on the Lower East Side

Of the hospital's population at the turn of the century, seventy-five percent were from Russia, another twenty percent from the regions of the Austro-Hungarian Empire, and essentially all of them were poor.

Seeking more permanent space, around 1895 the hospital acquired land at Jefferson and Cherry Streets. Construction began in 1900 and it opened in 1902, with the new building costing $115,000. Also in 1902, the Beth Israel Training School for Nurses was begun. Another building adjacent to the first was opened in 1904 to further expand the hospital. In 1907, the hospital created a department of social service, one of the first such in the nation. By the late 1910s, the hospital had a capacity of 150 beds.

It has been said that Beth Israel Hospital reflects the history of the Lower East Side as New York City's pioneering social laboratory where, in parallel, the settlement house movement was in full swing. Or as the New York Times would later write, "Beth Israel has been a part of the fabric of the Lower East Side since its founding in 1889."

There was enough financial support for a still larger hospital; in 1922 planning began accordingly and the cornerstone was laid, although construction would take a number of years.

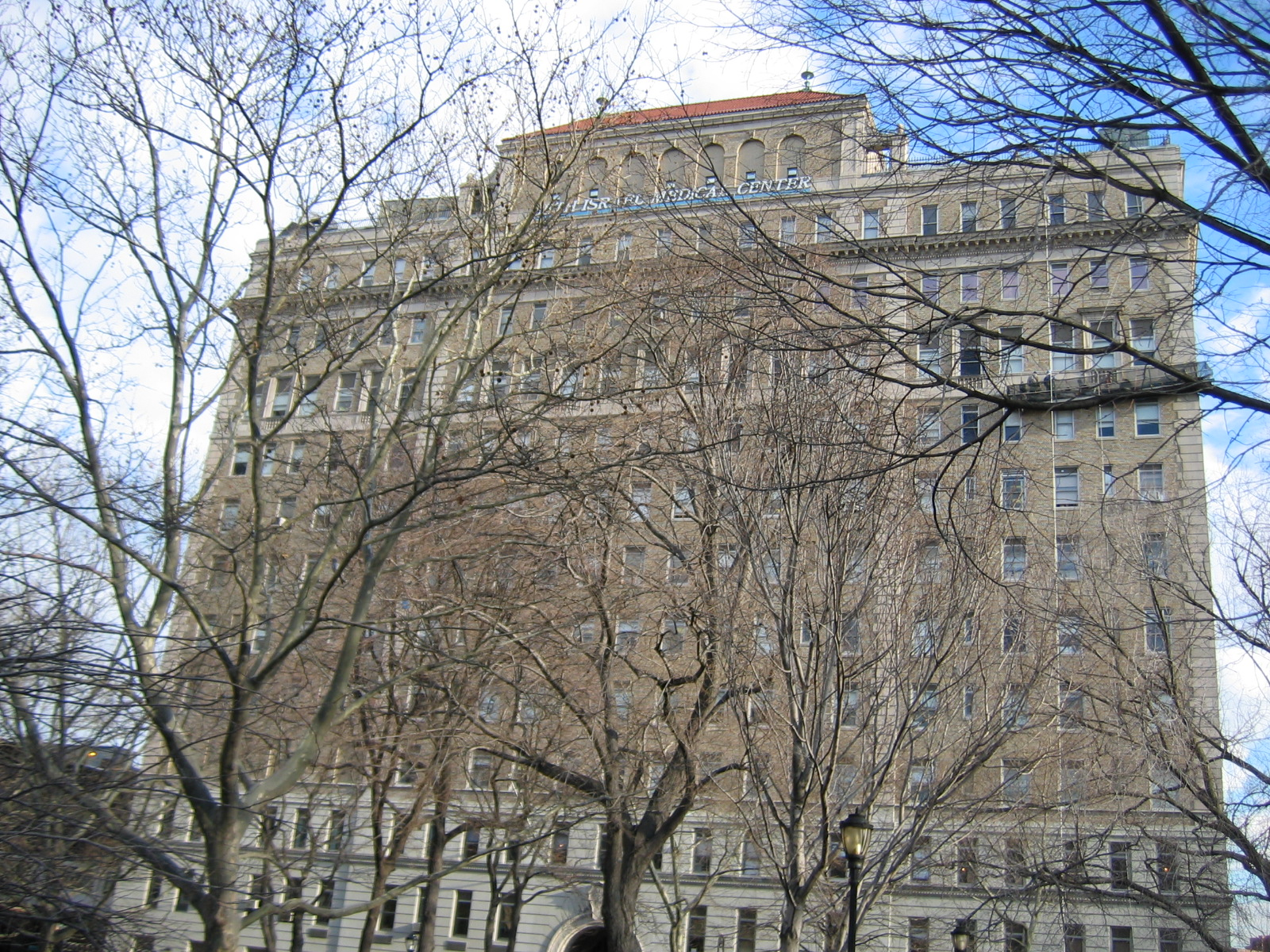
When it opened in 1929, the 13-story Stuyvesant Square building was the tallest hospital building in the world.

On March 12, 1929, Beth Israel moved to that new location, at First Avenue and 16th Street, facing Stuyvesant Square. There it rose over the trees in the park. The new facility had 500 beds and featured private rooms, rather than wards, for patients of all economic status. Funding for the construction was done through the Federation for the Support of Jewish Philanthropic Societies. The building at the old location was converted into an old age home, the Home of Old Israel.

In 1930, Jewish Maternity Hospital was merged into Beth Israel.

In 1935, the hospital began an affiliation with the University and Bellevue Hospital Medical College, which strengthened into a more direct link with the successor New York University College of Medicine in 1945.

== Beth Israel Medical Center ==
By the 1960s, Beth Israel was acquiring parcels of land in its First Avenue and 16th Street neighborhood and building new structures. In 1964, Beth Israel purchased its neighbor Manhattan General Hospital, a 455-bed establishment on the other side of Stuyvesant Square that had a large drug addiction treatment facility. Beth Israel also had plans to incorporate a newly reopened Gouverneur Hospital.

With all these steps in mind, the institution was renamed to the Beth Israel Medical Center on March 10, 1965. The Manhattan General portion was subsequently known as the Morris J. Bernstein Institute of Beth Israel Medical Center. In 1966, the hospital began an affiliation with the Mount Sinai School of Medicine.

By then it had extended beyond its Jewish base and was serving various new immigrant populations that had come into its neighborhood. It served the entire population of Lower Manhattan including Manhattan's Lower East Side, Chinatown, Gramercy, the West Village, and Chelsea.

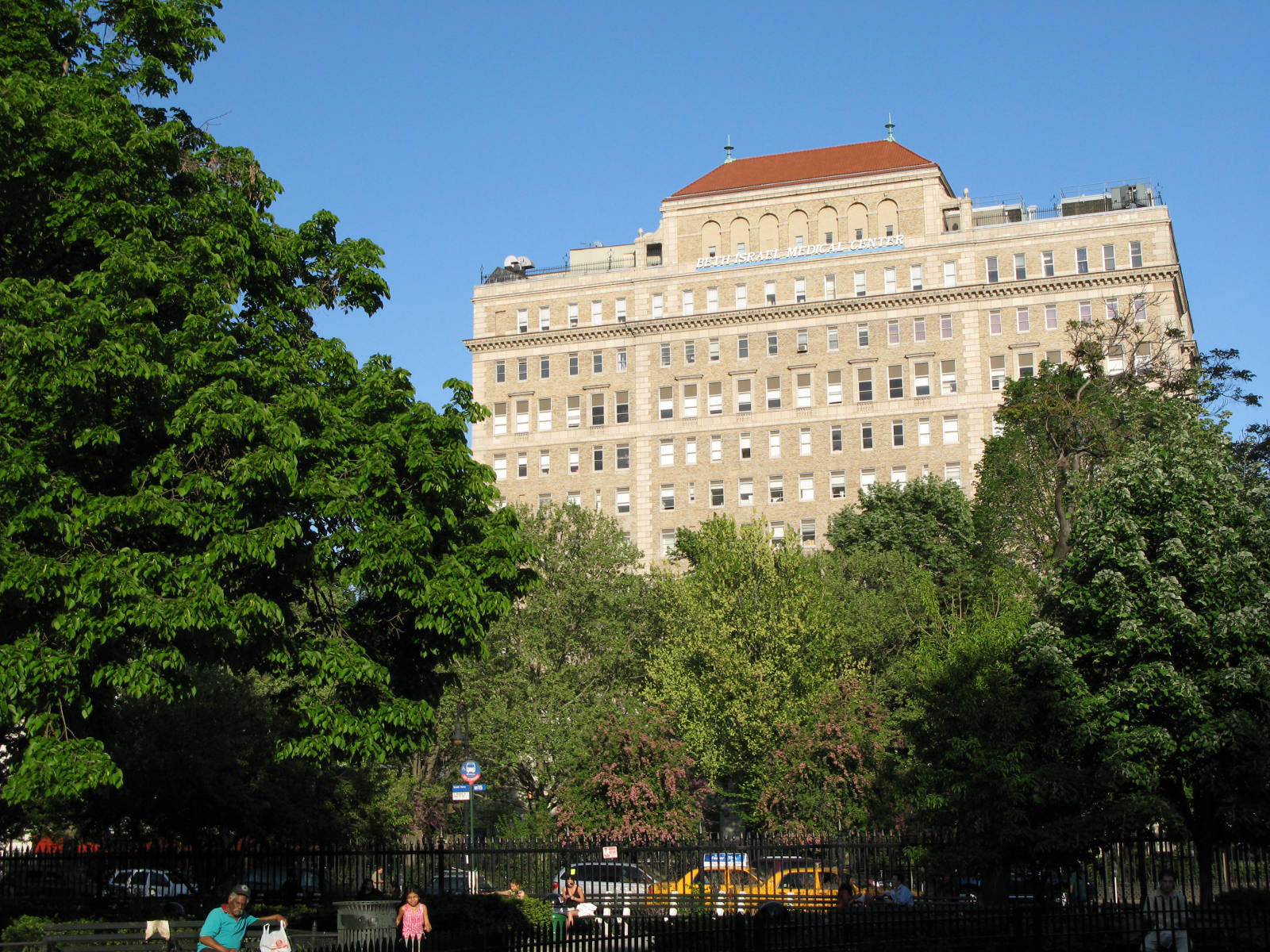
Beth Israel Medical Center as seen from Stuyvesant Square, 2007

It acted as University Hospital and Manhattan Campus for the Albert Einstein College of Medicine of Yeshiva University. The hospital was also a teaching hospital of St. George's University and the Phillips Beth Israel School of Nursing.

In 1988 it had the largest network of heroin-treatment clinics in the United States with 7,500 patients and 23 facilities. It acquired Doctors Hospital on the Upper East Side in the 1990s, renaming it Beth Israel Medical Center-Singer Division, and Kings Highway Hospital Center in Brooklyn in 1995, renaming it Beth Israel Medical Center-Kings Highway Division.

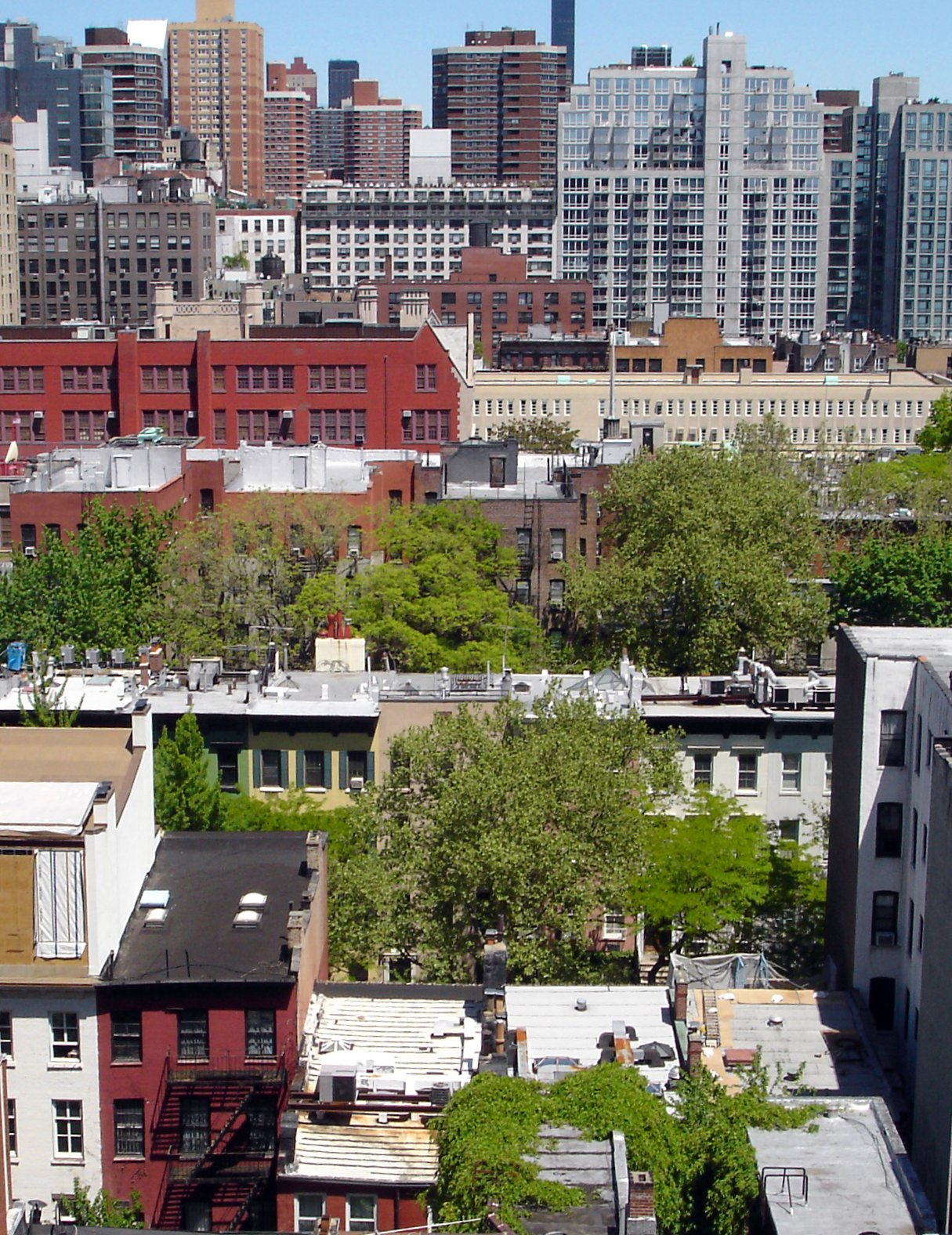
A view of Manhattan from Beth Israel, 2011

Starting in the late 1990s, Beth Israel Medical Center was a member of Continuum Health Partners, a nonprofit hospital system that included three other institutions: Roosevelt Hospital, St. Luke's Hospital and the New York Eye and Ear Infirmary. During much of this era, Beth Israel had 1,368 beds.

The Linsky Pavilion façade has appeared in many sitcoms, including Friends.

In 2004, the Singer Division closed and the Manhattan inpatient operations were consolidated in the buildings on First Avenue at 16th Street in Manhattan.

As of 2010 Beth Israel had residency training programs in nearly every major field of medicine including Emergency Medicine, Internal Medicine, Surgery, Otolaryngology, Oral and maxillofacial surgery, Radiology, Family Medicine, Dermatology, Obstetrics and Gynecology, Neurology, Ophthalmology, Pathology, Psychiatry, Podiatry, and Urology. Beth Israel also had a department of Chiropractic, Music Therapy, and Acupuncture.

== Mount Sinai Beth Israel ==
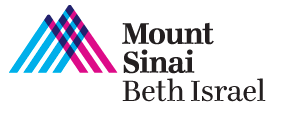

In 2013, there was a merger of Continuum Health Partners into The Mount Sinai Medical Center, with the result being the formation of the Mount Sinai Health System. The merger would combine Mount Sinai's expertise in specialty care and its medical school with Continuum's hospitals, including Beth Israel, which were focused on community-based primary care.

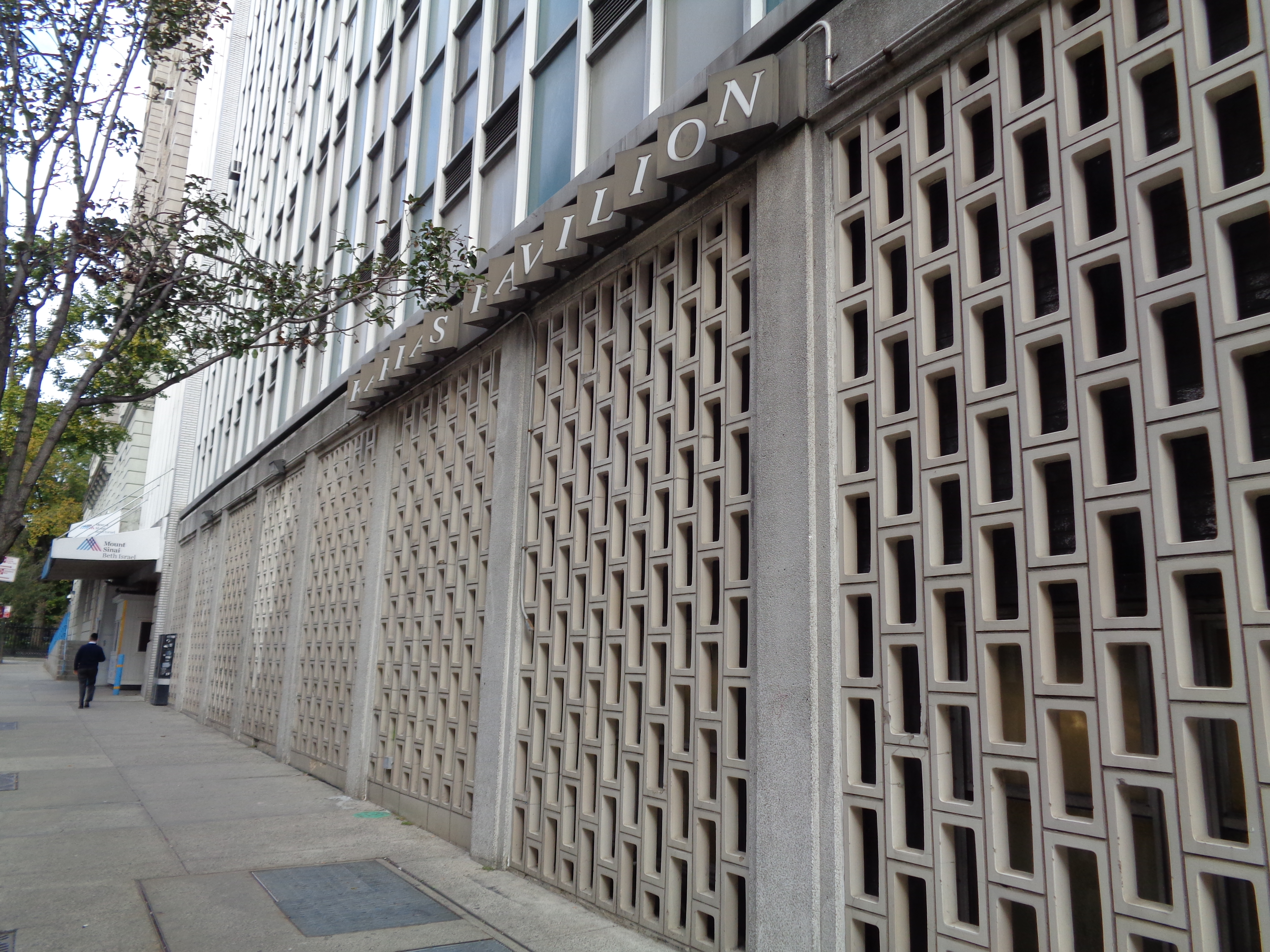
Karpas Pavilion

As part of brand unification, the name of Beth Israel Medical Center was changed to Mount Sinai Beth Israel. It thus also became an academic affiliate of the Icahn School of Medicine at Mount Sinai. During this period, the hospital had 799 beds.

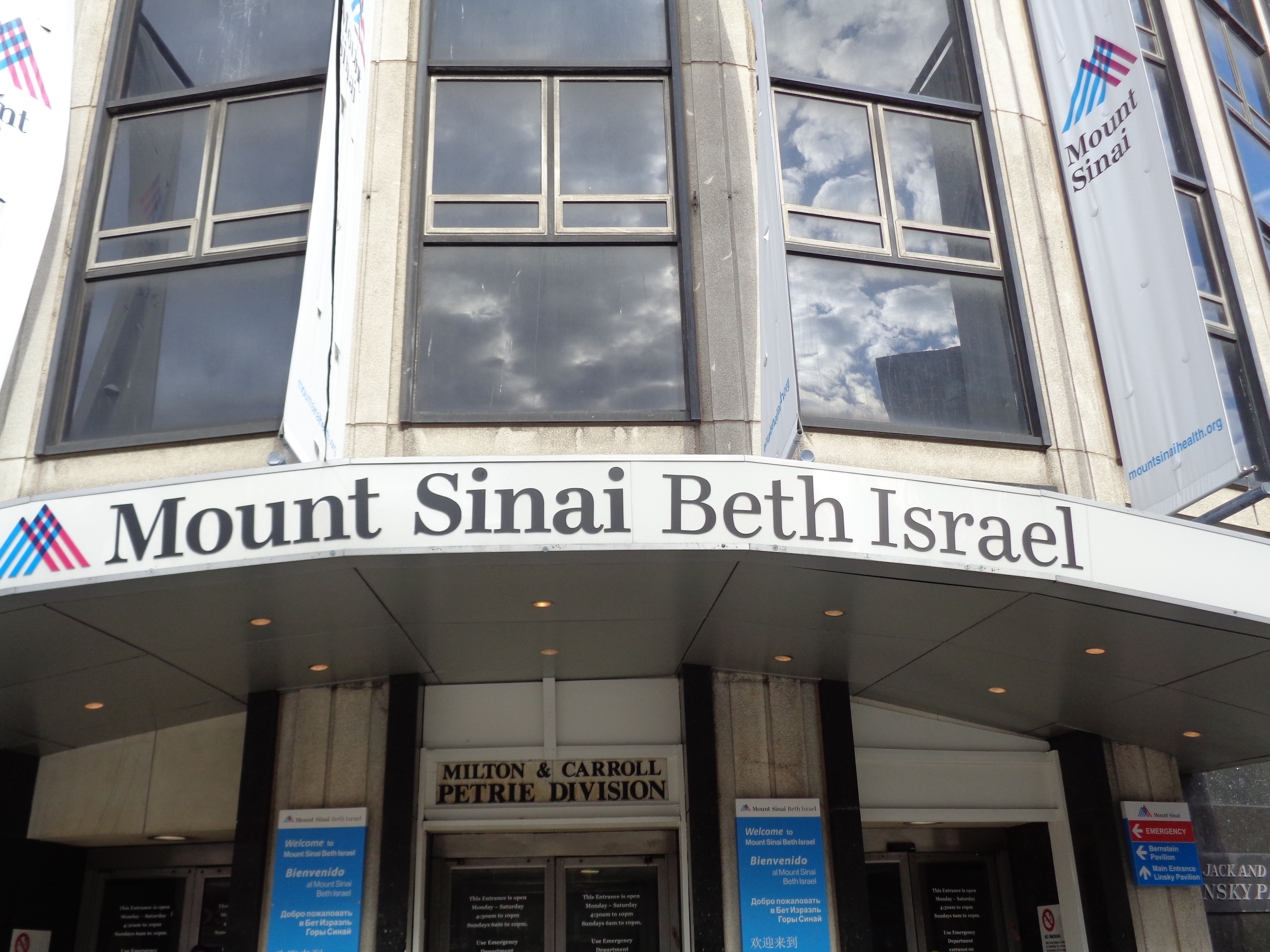
Entrance under Mount Sinai branding in 2017, soon after the initial closure-and-reopen plan was announced

On May 25, 2016, Mount Sinai announced a significant restructuring and downsizing, with plans to build a new hospital with only 70 inpatient beds on a site several blocks away, after which the main hospital on 16th Street would close and be sold. However, Mount Sinai said that a full emergency room would also be created as part the new arrangement. It was part of a wave of hospital closures that was affecting the city due to changing federal reimbursement structures and advances in medical practices requiring fewer and shorter hospital stays. In response to the action, U.S. Representative Carolyn B. Maloney said that, "Beth Israel has been a constant presence and resource for the entire city, and the East Side of Manhattan in particular."

On June 11, 2017, the hospital's Labor and Delivery Department closed, followed by the hospital's "Continuum Center for Health and Healing" later in the year.

By 2019, several elected officials in Manhattan were expressing concern about Mount Sinai's plan, saying that the proposed capacity of the new emergency care facility would not make up for the loss of the full hospital's emergency capability.

However, in the 2021 wake of the deadly COVID-19 pandemic in New York City, Mount Sinai reversed its decision regarding closing-and-downsizing Beth Israel.

== Closure ==
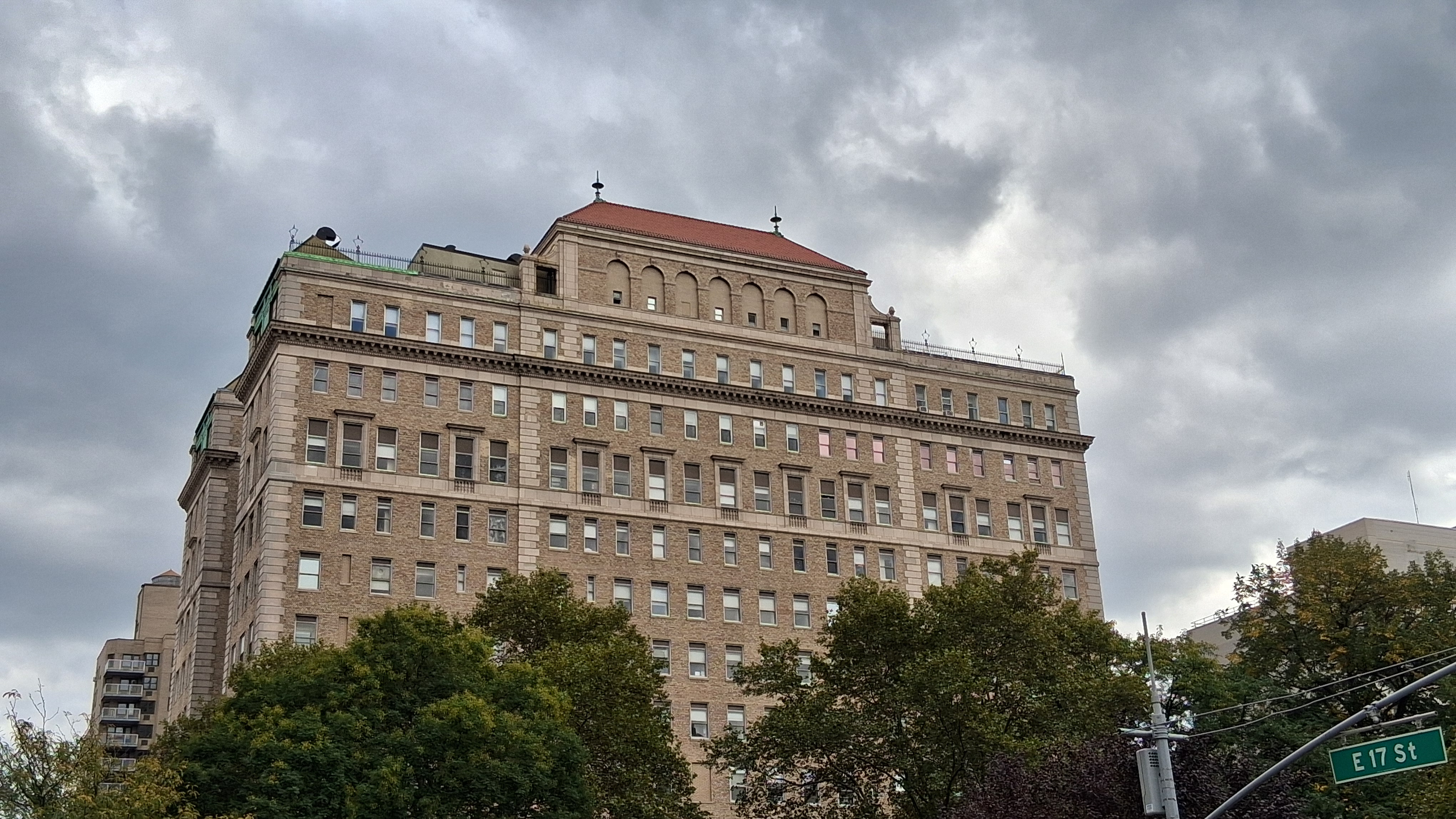
The Beth Israel building with its name removed from top, seen a half year after closure

In October 2023, Mount Sinai Health System announced its plan to close Mount Sinai Beth Israel by July 12, 2024, pending approval from the New York State Department of Health. Mount Sinai Beth Israel cited at the time that operations were at 20% capacity and losses of $1 billion in the last decade as reasons for the closure. The announcement prompted community protesters to form the Community Coalition to Save Beth Israel Hospital, which sued to keep the hospital open.

The court issued a temporary restraining order against the hospital in February 2024. The health department opposed the order, claiming that the court should not intervene in the regulation of medical facilities.

In August 2024, Moody's Investor Service downgraded Mount Sinai Hospital and Icahn School of Medicine to its lowest investment grade, Baa3. Moody's cited $1.8 billion in debt by the end of 2023, delays in closing the branch, and cash flow damages due to a cyber-attack in February 2024 at Mount Sinai's payment system, Change Healthcare.

Also in August 2024, the suit against closure was dismissed. A new complaint by the Community Coalition immediately followed the judgment.

In February 2025, the August 2024 lawsuit against closure was dismissed by New York Supreme Court Judge Jeffrey Pearlman. According to Gothamist, the hospital subsequently set a closing date for March 26, 2025.

On April 8, 2025, it was reported that the New York State Supreme Court, Appellate Division cleared the way for closure. The hospital was officially closed effective at 8 am on Wednesday, April 9, 2025.
