= Mount Sinai Health System =

Hospital system in New York City and surrounding suburbs

- Type: Nonprofit
- Industry: Health care
- Predecessor: Continuum Health Partners; The Mount Sinai Medical Center
- Founded: 2013; 13 years ago
- Headquarters: New York City, United States
- Number of locations: 7 hospital campuses and more than 400 outpatient practices
- Area served: New York metropolitan area
- Key people: John B. Hess (chair, Board of Trustees); Brendan G. Carr (chief executive officer); Eric J. Nestler (executive vice president); Margaret Pastuszko (president and chief operating officer); Vincent Tammaro (executive vice president and chief financial officer); Beth Essig (executive vice president and general counsel)
- Services: Hospital and ambulatory care, medical education, and biomedical research
- Revenue: US$12.8 billion (2025)
- Number of employees: Approximately 48,000 (2025)
- Website: www.mountsinai.org

The Mount Sinai Health System in New York City is one of New York State's largest hospital networks. It was formed in September 2013 by merging the operations of Continuum Health Partners and The Mount Sinai Medical Center.

The Health System is structured around seven hospital campuses, with the flagship hospital being The Mount Sinai Hospital (including Kravis Children's Hospital); the Icahn School of Medicine at Mount Sinai; and the Mount Sinai Phillips School of Nursing (PSON). The other hospitals are: Mount Sinai Brooklyn, Mount Sinai Queens, Mount Sinai Morningside (formerly Mount Sinai St. Luke's), Mount Sinai West (formerly Mount Sinai Roosevelt), New York Eye and Ear Infirmary of Mount Sinai, and Mount Sinai South Nassau. The health system formerly included Mount Sinai Beth Israel, which closed in April 2025.

As of 2026, the Health System includes more than 6,400 primary and specialty care physicians and 10 free-standing joint venture centers, including 5 endoscopy centers, 4 outpatient surgery centers, and 1 urgent care joint venture. It has over 400 outpatient practices throughout the five boroughs of New York City, Westchester County, and Long Island.

In the 2025-2026 fiscal year, the Health System employed more than 48,000 people and the Icahn School of Medicine at Mount Sinai had 47 multidisciplinary research, educational, and clinical institutes. In addition, the Health System reported 3,215 beds among its seven hospitals as well as 145,903 inpatient admissions, 372,959 Emergency Department visits, and more than 13,470 babies delivered

== History ==
The Mount Sinai Health System began as a single hospital, founded in 1852 and opened in 1855 as the Jews' Hospital. In 1864, the hospital became formally nonsectarian and, in 1866, changed its name to The Mount Sinai Hospital. The hospital is one of the oldest and largest teaching hospitals in the U.S. The hospital campus is located on the Upper East Side of Manhattan, beside Central Park.

In 1881, the Mount Sinai Hospital established a training school for doctors and nurses. Prior to its establishment it had been served by untrained male and female attendants. The school closed in September 1971 amid financial difficulties and a failed plan to affiliate with the City College of New York. The charter was taken up by The Mount Sinai Hospital School of Continuing Education in Nursing, founded in the fall of 1975.

In 1963 The Mount Sinai Hospital chartered The Mount Sinai School of Medicine, the first medical school to grow out of a non-university in more than 50 years. The school opened to students in 1968 and in 2012 changed its name to Icahn School of Medicine at Mount Sinai. The school and the hospital together formed The Mount Sinai Medical Center.

In 1993, Astoria General Hospital located on 30th Avenue in Astoria, Queens, became an affiliate of The Mount Sinai Hospital. A year later the hospital's name changed to Western Queens Community Hospital. In 1999, the hospital was purchased by Mount Sinai and had its name changed again, this time to Mount Sinai Queens, becoming the first community hospital to bear the Mount Sinai name.

In 2013, Mount Sinai Phillips School of Nursing (PSON), founded in 1902, became the nursing school of the Mount Sinai Health System.

In 2016, the Mount Sinai Health System announced a partnership with Stony Brook Medicine, allowing for joint programs between the Icahn School of Medicine at Mount Sinai and the Renaissance School of Medicine at Stony Brook University.

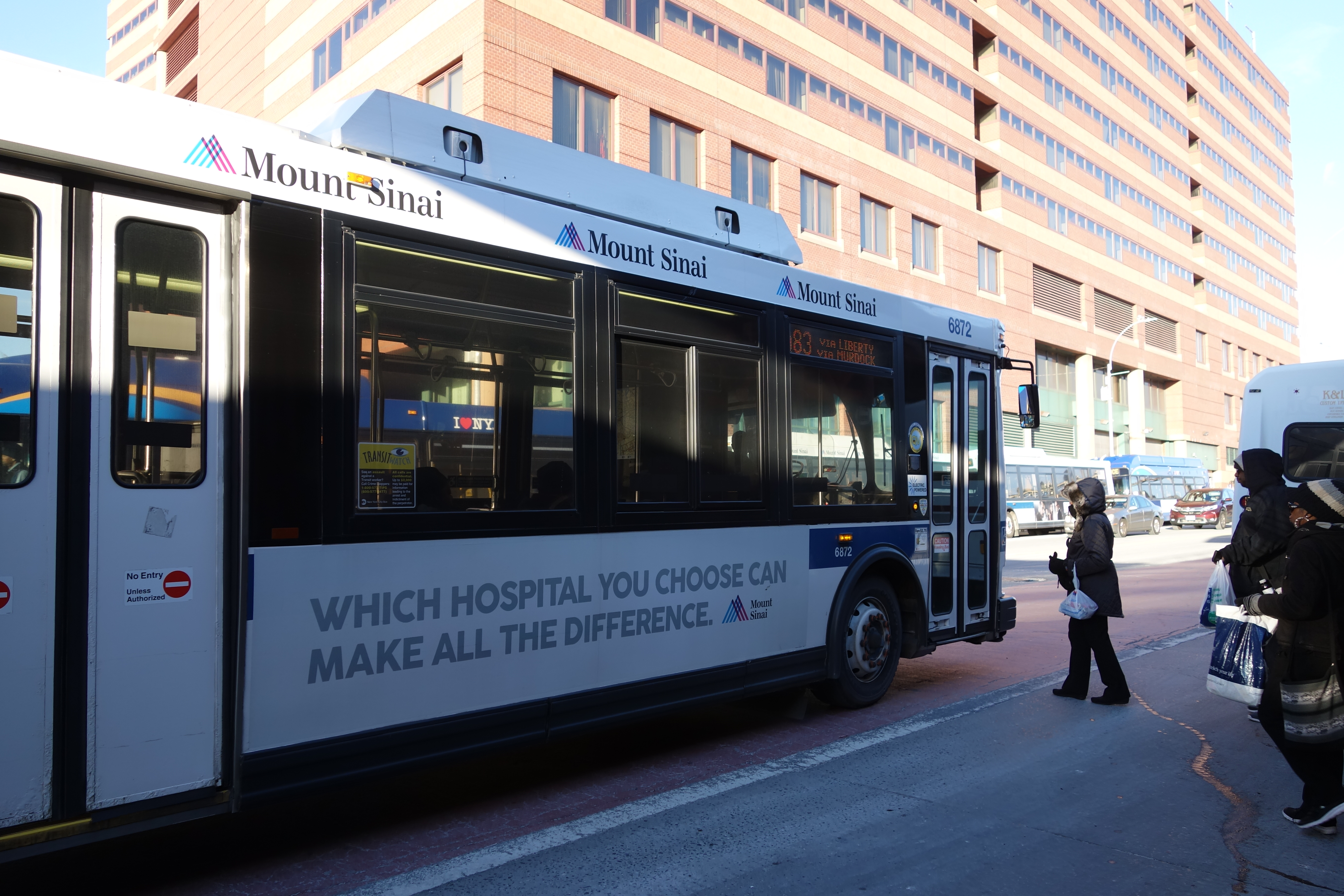
Generic Mount Sinai advertisement on side of bus, 2019

In September 2013, Continuum Health Partners completed a merger with the Mount Sinai Medical Center, thereby creating the Mount Sinai Health System. This brought Beth Israel Medical Center, St. Luke's-Roosevelt Hospital Center, and New York Eye and Ear Infirmary into the system, with the idea behind that merger being that Mount Sinai's expertise in specialty care and its having a medical school would combine well with Continuum's community-based, primary-care-focused hospitals. Brand unification was complete in January 2014.

While it was reported upon its creation that the Mount Sinai Health System was one of largest non-profit health systems in the United States, there are many other networks containing more hospitals.

The health system closed Mount Sinai Beth Israel in April 2025 after years of financial losses and diminishing inpatient counts, and despite community appeals to keep it open.

In September 2026, under threat from the Trump administration Department of Justice, the hospital system formally ended the provision of transgender healthcare for minors - and instead devoted $2 million in funding to "detransition care".

== Health system components ==
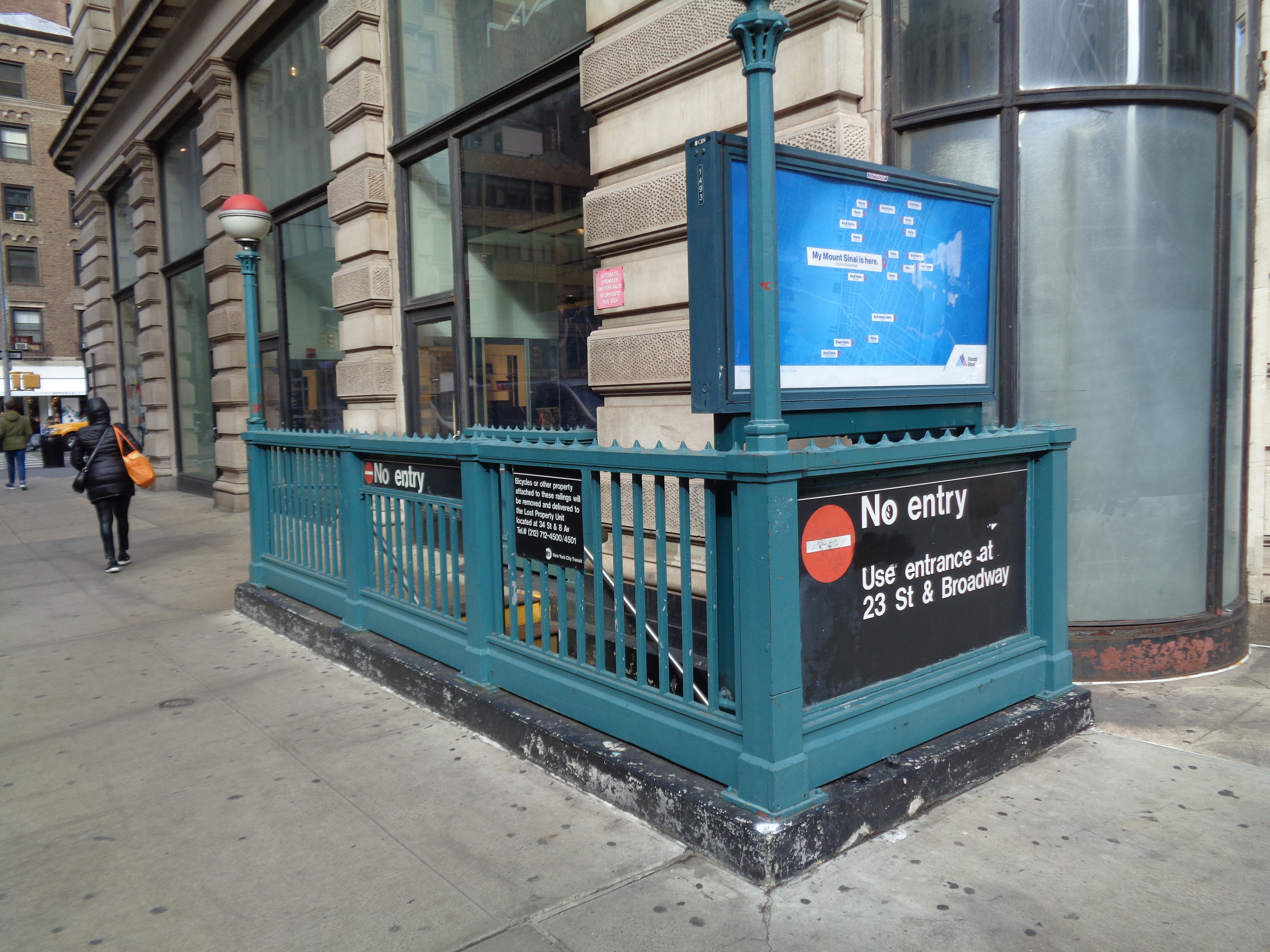
Subway exit advertisement showing all the different locations of the Mount Sinai Health System, 2017

=== Member hospitals, medical school & nursing school ===
- Mount Sinai Hospital
  - Kravis Children's Hospital
- Mount Sinai South Nassau
- Mount Sinai Brooklyn
- Mount Sinai Queens
- Mount Sinai Morningside (formerly Mount Sinai St. Luke’s)
- Mount Sinai West (formerly Mount Sinai Roosevelt)
- New York Eye and Ear Infirmary of Mount Sinai
- Icahn School of Medicine at Mount Sinai
- Mount Sinai Phillips School of Nursing (PSON)

=== Hospital affiliates ===
- The Brooklyn Hospital Center
- Elmhurst Hospital Center
- Jupiter Medical Center
- Queens Hospital Center
- Richmond University Medical Center
- Valley Health System

=== Nursing home and long-term care facility affiliates ===
- Archcare at Terence Cardinal Cooke Health Care Center
- James J. Peters VA Medical Center Home
- Jewish Home Lifecare (Bronx)
- Jewish Home Lifecare (Manhattan)

=== Additional components ===
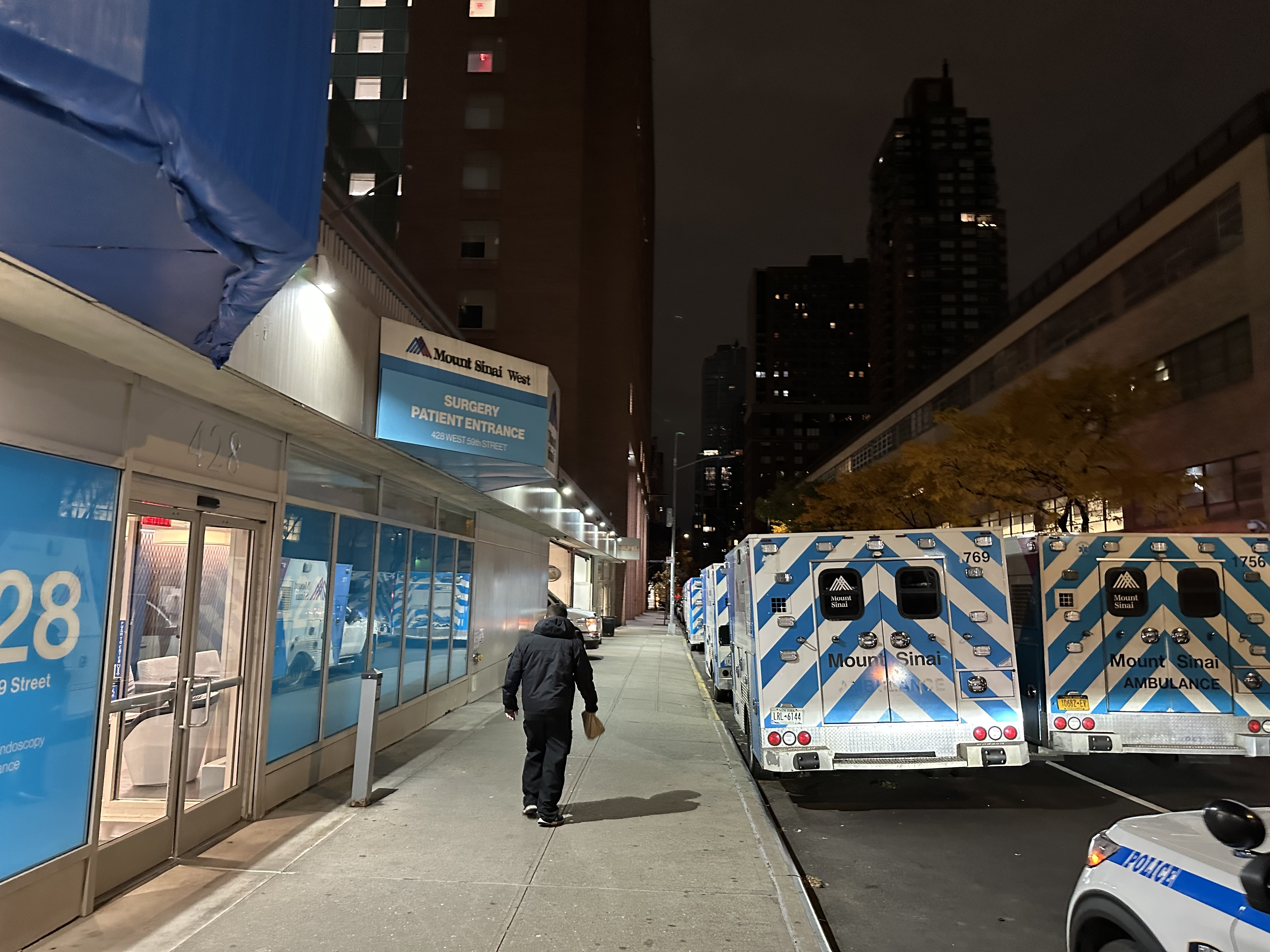
Mount Sinai Health System Emergency Medical Services operates a fleet of ambulances, here seen in 2025 parked in early morning darkness outside Mount Sinai West

- Mount Sinai Health Network owned physician practices
- Mount Sinai Health Network affiliated physician practices
- Mount Sinai Doctors faculty practice (urgent care and outpatient practices)
- Mount Sinai Health System Emergency Medical Services

== Disputes ==
In May 2017, government officials accused Mount Sinai of improper billing. Mount Sinai acknowledged partial wrongdoing and agreed to repay certain claims retroactively. That year, Mount Sinai West settled a case over improper patient record disclosures paying a $387,000 fine.

In April 2019, eight current and former employees sued Mount Sinai and four executives, alleging age and sex discrimination at the Arnhold Institute for Global Health. They were also accused of misusing funds, deceiving donors, and violating federal rules. In May 2019, over 150 Icahn School students urged Mount Sinai’s board to investigate the discrimination claims. In July 2023, the New York County Supreme Court dismissed the plaintiffs' claims.

A dispute between Mount Sinai and UnitedHealthcare arose over reimbursement rates. Mount Sinai claimed it was underpaid by 30–50% and sought higher rates, while United said the increases would add massive costs. After talks broke down, UnitedHealthcare dropped six Mount Sinai hospitals from its network on January 1, 2024, leaving 1.3 million patients out-of-network and disrupting ongoing care. On March 19, 2024, a deal restored in-network access, which both sides called a patient victory.

In early 2026, there was a strike by nurses of the New York State Nurses Association against three of the hospitals within the Mount Sinai Health System. The strike, which lasted a month before being settled, caused serious disruptions, with elective surgeries not taking place and patients sometimes being moved to uninvolved hospitals. Mount Sinai spent many millions of dollars hiring temporary replacement nurses during the work outage.
