= Continuum Health Partners =

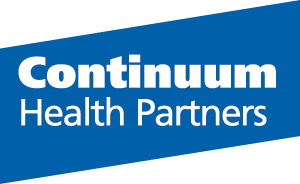
Continuum Health Partners logo

Continuum Health Partners was a hospital network in New York City that was created in 1997 and comprised Beth Israel Medical Center, St. Luke's-Roosevelt Hospital Center, and, joining a bit later, New York Eye and Ear Infirmary. For a while, Long Island College Hospital was also part of it. In 2013, Continuum Health Partners was merged with The Mount Sinai Medical Center to create the new Mount Sinai Health System network.

== History ==
On January 9, 1997, St. Luke's-Roosevelt and Beth Israel Medical Center formed Greater Metropolitan Health Systems, Inc., renamed Continuum Health Partners in April 1998, which became the parent corporation while the two hospital centers remained separate entities with their own hospital campuses. Included in this was Beth Israel's Kings Highway Division, which was the old Kings Highway Hospital Center in Brooklyn. The Continuum hospitals tended to offer community-oriented, primary health care.

Drawing on complementary strengths, Continuum Health Partners offered a broad based fully integrated health services network throughout the New York City metropolitan region. This capability was augmented with the addition of The New York Eye & Ear Infirmary in 1999.

By 2000, Continuum Health Partners was engaging in active sports sponsorship agreements with the New York Yankees, New York Knicks, and New York Liberty, even though players from those teams needing medical treatment did not always go to Continuum hospitals.

In April 2010, Aetna notified policyholders that it was in a contract dispute with Continuum Health Partners and that the contract would lapse as of June 5, 2010. The June 5 date passed and the contract lapsed. Continuum Health Partners provided subscribers with a form to request that Aetna retain their physicians for one year or until the policy period ended. On July 28, 2010, Continuum Health Partners announced a new agreement with Aetna. Within this agreement, it was noted that the effective date would be retroactive to the April 5, 2010, termination date.

Also part of the Continuum medical consortium was Long Island College Hospital in Brooklyn. It was in financial distress, however, and in 2011, Long Island College Hospital left Continuum and was instead merged into SUNY Downstate, although the arrangement failed to revive its fortunes.

With a total combined annual operating budget of $2.1 billion, Continuum hospitals delivered inpatient care through nearly 3,100 certified beds located in seven major facilities in Manhattan and Brooklyn, while providing outpatient care in private practice settings and ambulatory centers. Continuum treated patients in Brooklyn, Manhattan and Westchester County.

At one point, Continuum considered trying to incorporate the struggling St. Vincent's Hospital in lower Manhattan, but in the end declined due to not being able to make the finances given mandates to keep certain services going.

By the 2010s, there was a national trend towards greater hospital consolidation. Continuum Health Partners engaged in merger discussions with NYU Langone Medical Center for eight months beginning in late 2021. Then in June 2012, The Mount Sinai Medical Center came to Continuum with its own merger proposal, fearing that a large Continuum–NYU combination would undercut its own position in the city's healthcare ecosystem. Continuum responded in a positive fashion to Mount Sinai; this caused NYU Langone to break off its talks with Continuum, saying that Continuum had acted in bad faith.

A further year of discussions between Continuum and Mount Sinai ensued, before a definitive merger agreement was announced in July 2013. The idea behind that merger was that Mount Sinai's expertise in specialty care and its having a medical school would combine well with Continuum's hospitals which were focused on community-based primary care.

In September 2013, the deal was closed. Continuum Health Partners ceased to exist, and the new Mount Sinai Health System hospital network came into being. Brand unification was completed in January 2014.

== See also ==
- University Hospital of Brooklyn at Long Island College Hospital
- Polhemus Memorial Clinic
