= Roberto Cueva del Río =

Mexican artist (1908–1988)

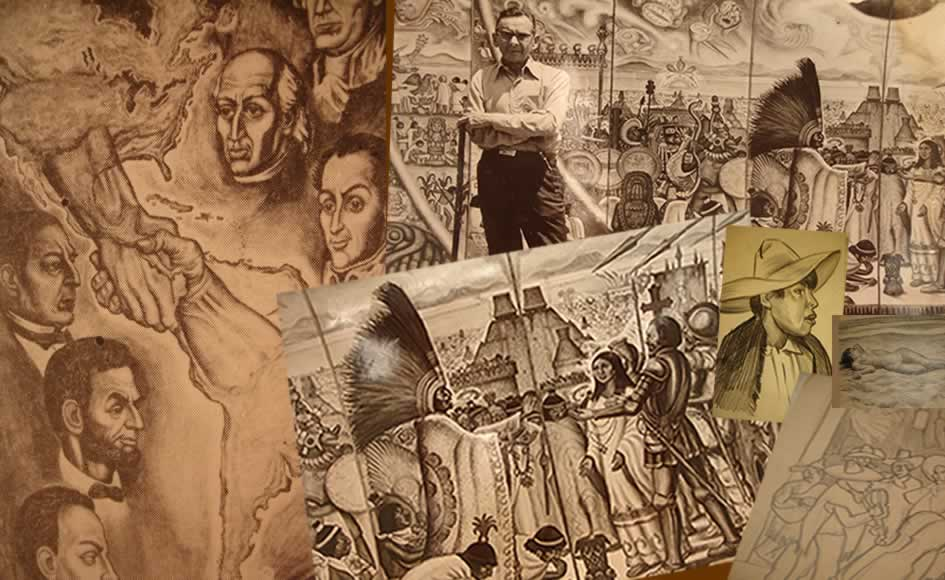
- Born: Rodolfo Roberto De La Cueva Del Río; April 28, 1908; Puebla, Puebla, Mexico
- Died: June 24, 1988 (aged 80); Mexico City, Mexico
- Education: Academy of San Carlos
- Known for: Painting, Muralist
- Movement: Mexican Mural Movement, Social Realism & Folklore
- Spouse: Ana María Santoyo

Roberto Cueva del Río (April 28, 1908 – June 24, 1988), born as Rodolfo Roberto De La Cueva Del Río, was a Mexican muralist. He was given a number of commissions by Lázaro Cárdenas for works in Michoacan, including Pátzcuaro and Cárdenas's birthplace of Jiquilpan.

== Early life and education ==
When Roberto Cueva del Río was six, he and his family moved to Mexico City, where he attended elementary school. In 1923, he worked with Ernesto García Cabral who was a political cartoonist for the Excélsior newspaper.

From 1924 to 1928, he attended Escuela Nacional de Bellas Artes de la Universidad Nacional and Academy of San Carlos, where he was taught by Germán Gedovious, Sóstenes Ortega, and Raziel Cabildo. The dean Alfonso Pruneda granted a monthly scholarship support of $40 to support his academic studies in fine arts. With this scholarship, and money earned from his own work, he became an art teacher in rural schools across some Mexican states.

== Career ==
=== Early career (1920s–1930s) ===
In 1926, Cueva del Río painted his first murals in elementary schools from the Ministry of Public Education of Mexico. Two years later, he held his first exposition, featuring drawings and political-cartoons.

In 1930, Diego Rivera, then director of the National School of Fine Arts (Escuela Nacional de Bellas Artes), gave Cueva del Río a letter of recommendation for the governor of the Mexican State of Puebla Leonidas Andrew Almazán, who in turn supported his proposal to travel to the United States. Howard S. Phillips, editor of Mexican Life Magazine, sent a note to Anita Brenner, in which he praised Cueva del Río's work. In the same year, he painted new murals in Cuernavaca, Morelos, Mexico, with typical folkloric themes.

Cueva del Río was invited to Delphic Studios Gallery, owned by Alma Reed, to exhibit his work in 1931, where his art received excellent comments from U.S. critics, along with attention from José Juan Tablada, who may have helped him earn the commission to paint the murals in the Mexican Embassy in Washington, D.C.

He began work in Palacio de Gobierno in Chilpancingo, capital of the state of Guerrero, Mexico, in 1933, along with work on the Embassy frescos. They had the theme La Fiesta de las Flores y Frutas en Tehuantepec (Flowers and Fruits Party in Tehuantepec), also called Fiesta Tehuana; Los Volcanes, Fraternidad Panamericana (The Volcanoes and Pan-American Fraternity). The fresco garnered much excitement in Mexico, with the El Nacional newspaper publishing an article on June 19, 1934, about the artist's return to Mexico. The article claimed that the fresco would become the biggest in the world due to the way it connected from the floor to the ceiling via the central stairs, and proceeded to praise him, comparing him to other painters including Rivera, as well as José Clemente Orozco and David Alfaro Siqueiros. In the mural, writer Carlos Fuentes is pictured in his youth.

In 1938, Cueva del Río returned to Mexico, where he worked for President General Lázaro Cárdenas del Río on several projects, including a Mayan-themed frieze for the dining room of his private home in Jiquilpan, and a large mural called Historia y Paisaje de Michoacán for the dining room of his house in Pátzcuaro named Casa Eréndira (today occupied by the CREFAL). He also completed two small panels on the traditional dance of the fish and the market in a viewpoint called Cerro Colorado or Estribo Chico in Pátzcuaro. Additionally, he worked on frescos in an elementary school on the island of Yunuén in Lake Pátzcuaro. He decorated the auditorium of the Teatro Emperador Caltzontzin during this period, and painted a fresco in the foyer on the second floor.

=== Mid career (1940s–1960s) ===
In 1941, Cueva del Río did a series of eight oil paintings for the Gallery of Michoacán Heroes, one of which has since been lost. These were placed in the reception hall of the Governor's Palace (Palacio de Gobierno) Morelia City, Michoacán.

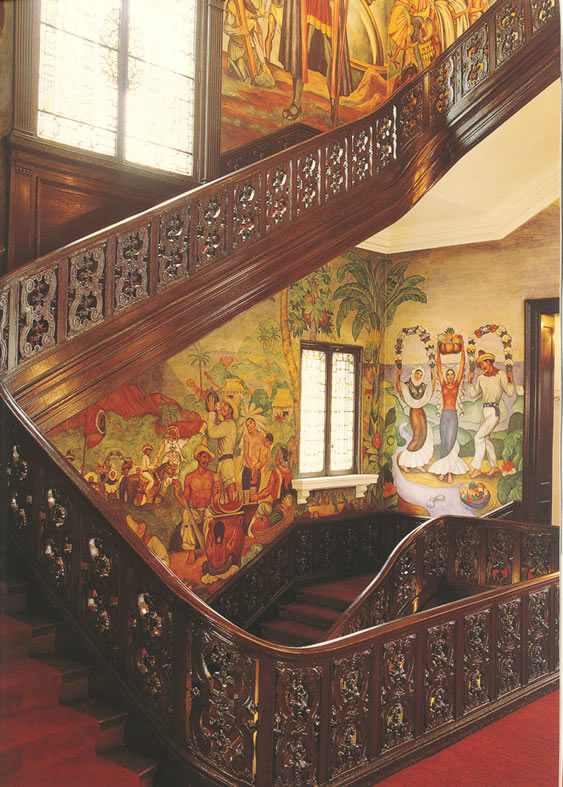
Murals in the Embajada de México in Washington.

A year later, he was designated Director of the National School of Fine Arts in Morelia. He decorated the main congress hall with a mural Congreso de Apatzingán in 1944, was commissioned for personal portraits, and created political magazine covers the following year. In 1952, he painted a mural themed around the Conquest of Mexico in the Palacio de Gobierno in Chilpancingo, Guerrero.

In 1955, he painted murals in Valle del Mezquital, and in the former San Francisco Convent Museum in 1956. During 1957, Cueva del Río portrayed Guerrero's revolution history in the Palacio de Gobierno in Chilpancingo City, Guerrero. He painted murals in the hall of the ex government palace in 1962, and in 1963, a Morelos-themed portrait for the deputy's chamber at Cortés Palace in Cuernavaca in Morelos.

He painted two murals in 1964, depicting the Plan de Alaya and General Alvarez's protest in Cuernavaca. One of the murals was painted in the Casino de la Selva Hotel, and the other in Cuernavaca city hall. In 1966, he painted a large portrait of Hidalgo the Liberator, at the Senate of Mexico City. The following year, he created illustrations of the history of the Mexico Conquest for a book about the history of Mexico. In 1968, five portraits of important Mexican doctors were created to decorate the halls of the psychiatric hospital in Mexico City. In the same year, he taught watercolor, drawing and composition classes at the University of Mexico and also painted a mural at Government Palace Hall in Acapulco, Guerrero.

=== Late career (1970s–1980s) ===
In 1973, he decorated the Acapulco municipal palace with six large murals about the history and customs of the Mexican port. In 1976, he created a folding screen piece with a Conquest of Mexico theme, involving encounter of two cultures, the fusion of the Mexican-Indian culture and European races, and the aftermath.

During 1980, he traveled to Europe and did several watercolors in Spain, France, and Italy. In 1985, he did several easel paintings in watercolor, oil and acrylic in the states of Morelos, Guerrero, Mexico, and Puebla and some other locations in Mexico.

== Death ==
Cueva del Río died in 1988 at the age of 80 due to an accident in his house, though he was already in poor health at the time.

== Gallery ==
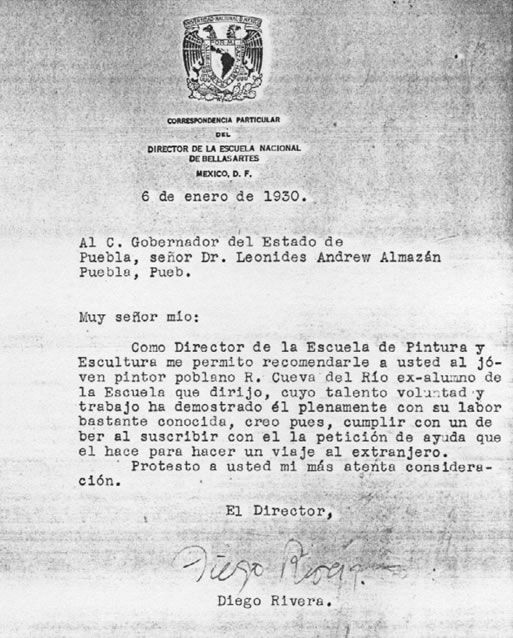
Diego Rivera's letter of recommendation

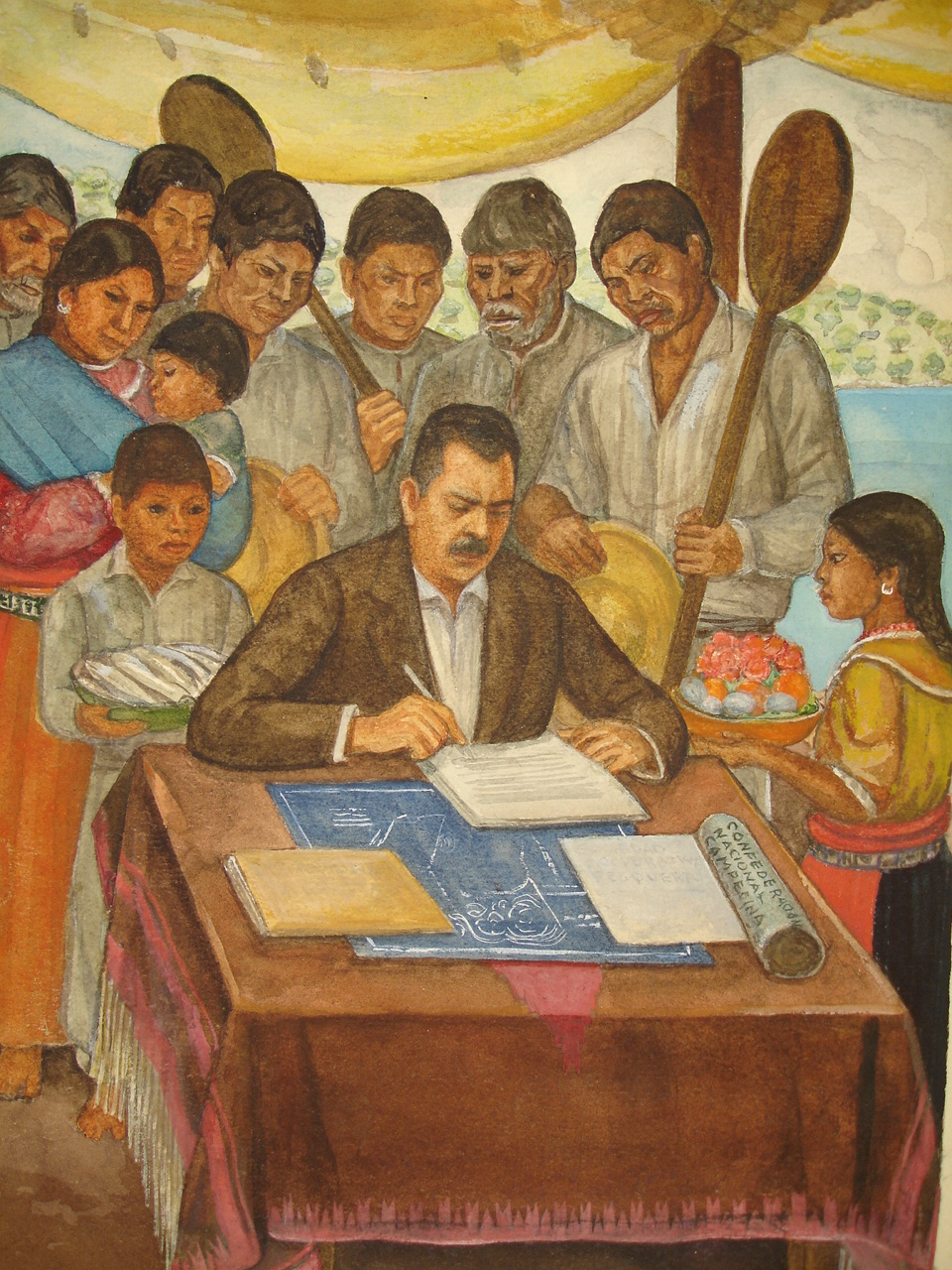
Casa Eréndira

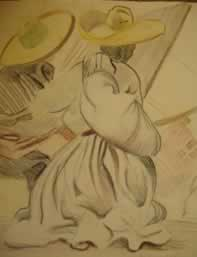
Inditos Coloreados

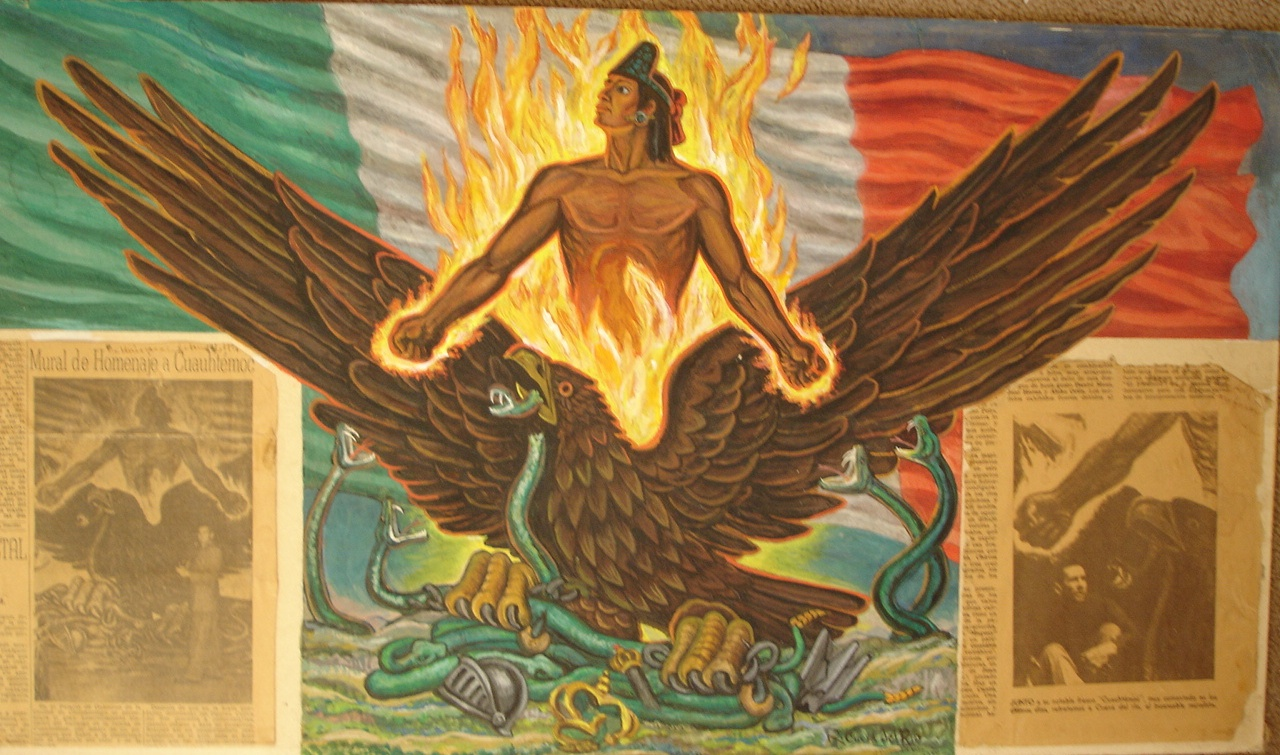
Cuahutémoc en llamas

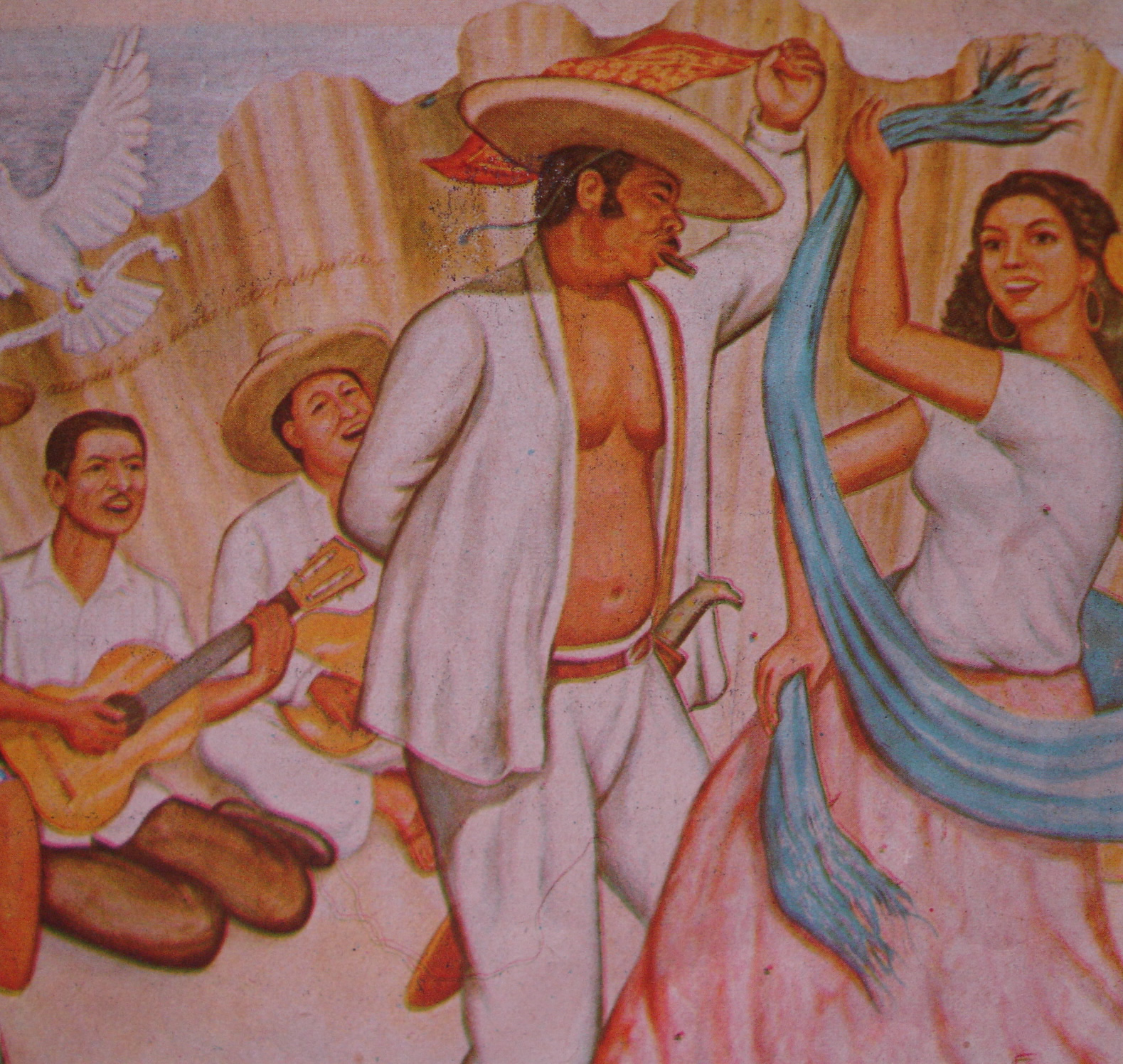
Mural en el Palacio de gobierno in Acapulco, en Guerrero

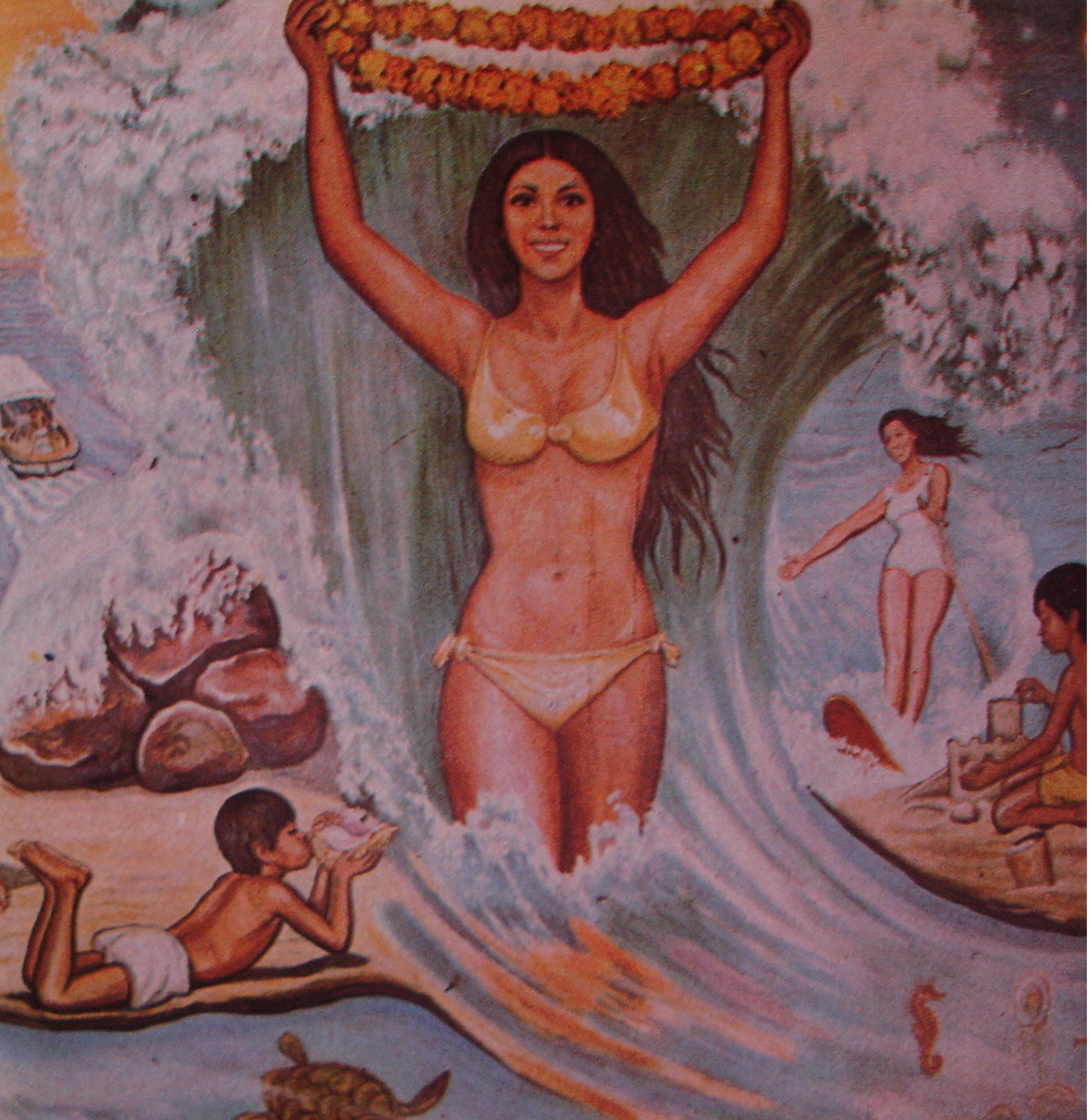
Mural en el Palacio de gobierno in Acapulco, en Guerrero

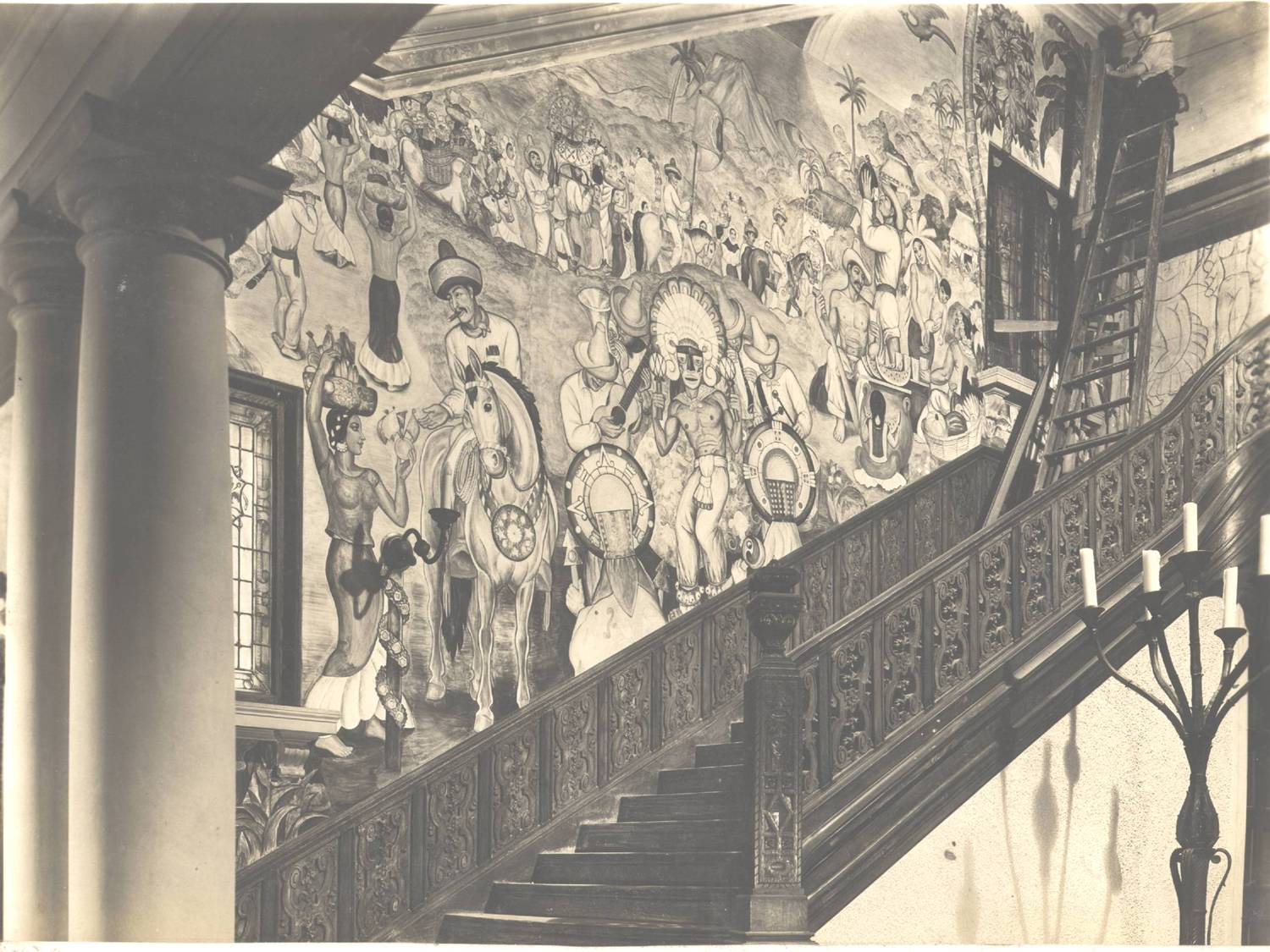
Work in the Mexican Embassy, Washington D.C., 1933

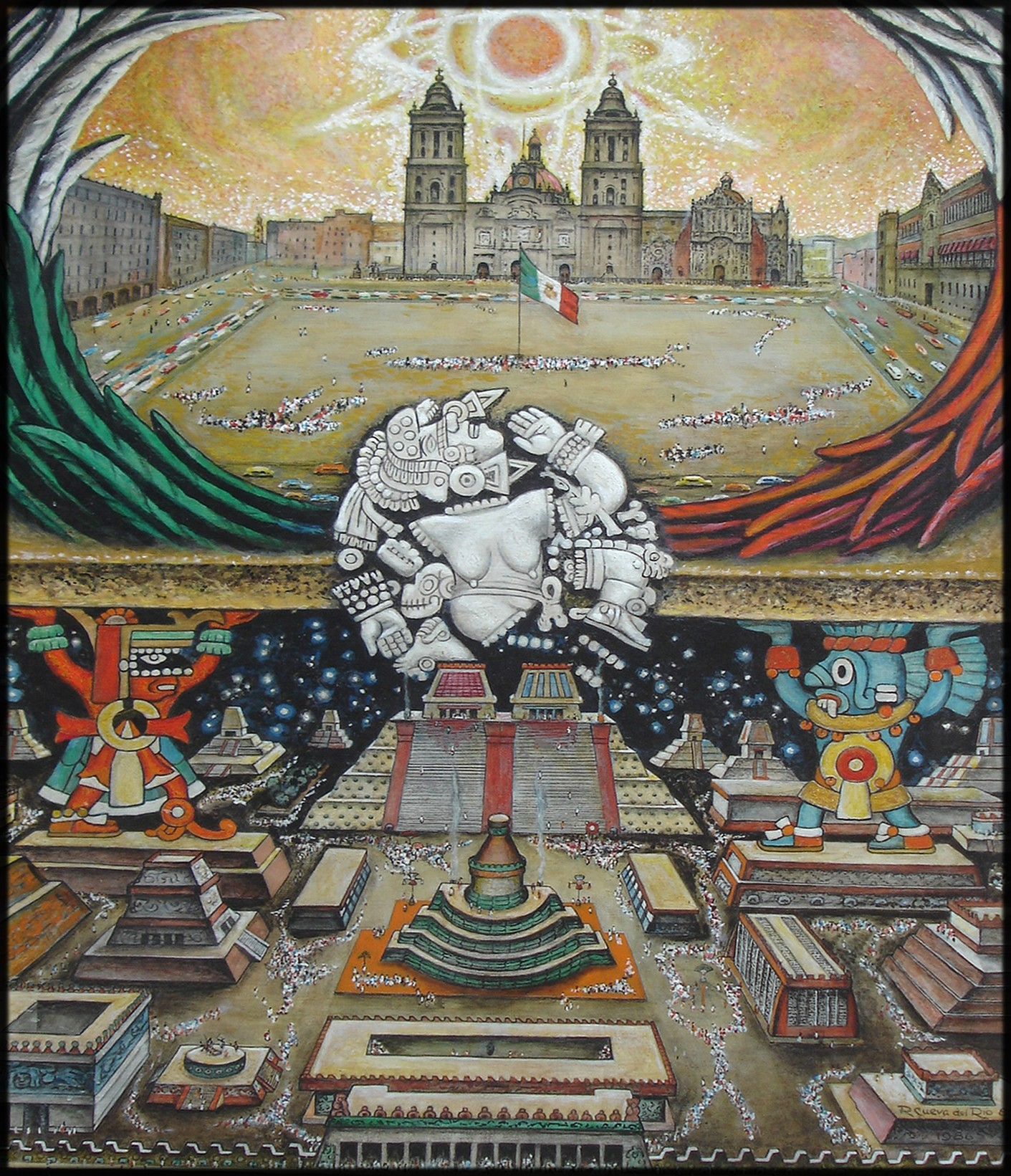
Fundacion Tenochtitlan
