= Alma Reed =

American journalist (1889–1966)

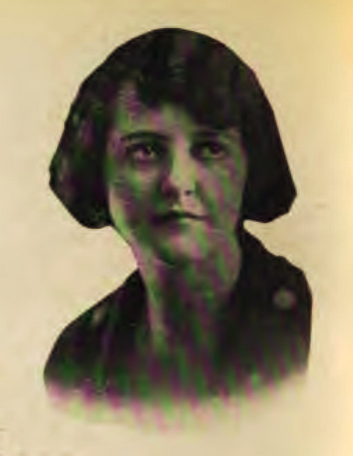
Reed in a 1922 publication.

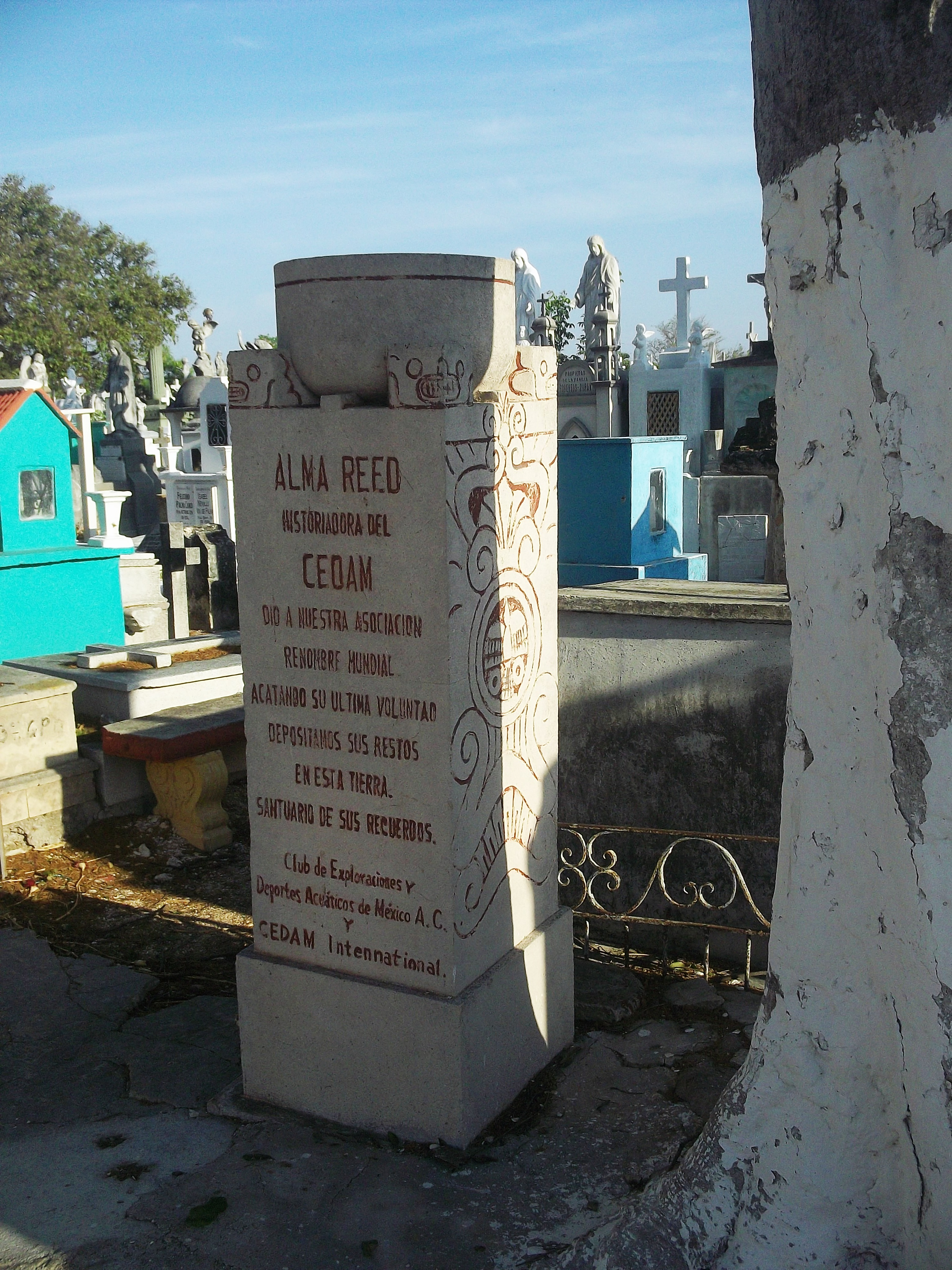
Tomb of Alma Reed in Mérida, Yucatán

Alma Marie Sullivan Reed (1889–1966) was an American journalist. While working in Mexico in the 1920s, she fell in love with the Governor of Yucatán, Felipe Carrillo Puerto; however, he was assassinated while she was home in San Francisco preparing for their wedding. Reed was a promoter of the career of Mexican muralist José Clemente Orozco and wrote the first monograph on the artist in 1932, as well as a biography about his life. She also wrote more generally on Mexican muralists.

== Early life ==
A San Francisco native, Reed was born Alma Sullivan into an Irish Catholic family in 1889. Her marriage to businessman Samuel Payne Reed ended in annulment after he became ill. Outspoken, adventurous and bohemian, she carried what one observer described as the "mystic ailments that sometimes befall the people" of California.

== Journalism career ==
She rose to fame as a journalist while writing for The San Francisco Call. An advocate for the disenfranchised, she was responsible for helping change the state's death penalty laws after she wrote a series of articles in 1921 about the death sentence given to a 17-year-old Mexican boy convicted of murder. Her articles led to the state commuting his sentence. Her writing won her an invitation by Mexican President Alvaro Obregón to be his guest in Mexico City. While traveling through the Yucatán, in 1923, she wrote another series of articles on the thefts and plundering of Mayan artifacts for the Peabody Museum at Harvard University by US diplomat, explorer and archaeologist Edward Herbert Thompson. The articles led the museum to return some of the objects to Mexico.

== Art patron and gallerist ==
The New York Times took notice of the young journalist and hired her to continue reporting from Mexico and later, the Middle East. By 1928, she settled in New York City and dubbed her apartment "the Ashram" to honor the Hindu hermitage where sages lived in peace among nature and to pay homage to Mahatma Gandhi's pacifism.

=== Support for José Clemente Orozco ===
Reed was a lifelong supporter and patron of José Clemente Orozco. Early after establishing the studio, Reed was introduced to Orozco by Anita Brenner. Orozco had been living in Manhattan and doing poorly in making a living. She immediately fell in love with his work and gave him a one-man show in September 1928. In 1930, Reed arranged a commission for Orozco to paint a mural in the new dining hall at Pomona College in California. Orozco painted Prometheus. The financial arrangements with Reed were fraught, with Orozco believing that Reed "was not giving him an adequate share of the proceeds from the sale of his works." She nonetheless continued to support his career.

Her studio became a gathering place for Mexican artists especially those living in New York. She became friends with Jose L. Gutierrez who was a WPA fresco supervisor and was experimenting at Sherwin-Williams laboratories with plastic resins, which led to plastic paint formulas developed in 1953 as the first acrylic artist paint called "Politec."

=== Delphic Studios ===
Not long after her solo Orozco exhibition, Reed rented a portion of the top floor of the building on East 57th Street and established a formal gallery called "Delphic Studios." Reed's first exhibition in the gallery was a two-man show of Thomas Hart Benton and Orozco.

She promoted many Mexican artists, including Roberto Cueva del Río, but she remained the principal patron for Orozco. She also exhibited the Mexican-themed watercolors and oils of Los Angeles artist Leo Politi in 1937. The one-man exhibit helped launch Politi's career as an author and illustrator of children's books. She also displayed woodcarvings by Mae Woughter Strack.

== Selected works ==
- Reed, Alma. Peregrina. Ed. Michael K. Schuessler. ISBN 978-0-292-70239-4
- José Clemente Orozco. 1st ed. New York: Delphic Studios, 1932. Republished New York : Hacker Art Books, 1985.
- The Mexican Muralists. New York: Crown Publishers, 1960.
