= 2026 New York City nurses strike =

Labor action by nurses in New York City

- Hospital locations where the strike occurred, grouped by when the action ended
- Date: Mount Sinai network, Montefiore: January 12, 2026 – February 11, 2026; (4 weeks and 2 days); NewYork-Presbyterian/Columbia hospital: January 12, 2026 – February 19, 2026; (1 month and 1 week)
- Location: New York City, New York, United States
- Caused by: Unmanageable patient loads, understaffing, safety
- Goals: Obtaining a contract with higher wages, increased benefits, improved working conditions, safe staffing standards, workplace violence protections, protections for immigrant patients and nurses, safeguards against artificial intelligence
- Methods: Strike action; Picketing
- Result: Strike ended with tentative agreement on contract terms

Parties
| New York State Nurses Association; National Nurses United | Mount Sinai; Montefiore Medical Center; NewYork-Presbyterian |

Number
- nearly 15,000

On January 12, 2026, nearly 15,000 nurses began a labor strike after failed negotiations to replace the December 31, 2025 expiration of the previous collective labor agreement. The nurses were employed across three private New York City hospital systems: NewYork-Presbyterian (NYP), Mount Sinai, and Montefiore Medical Center.

The nurses were represented by the New York State Nurses Association (NYSNA), an affiliate of National Nurses United (NNU).

== Background ==
In 2023, PBS NewsHour reported that hospitals nationwide were dealing with severe staffing shortages, overworked nurses dating back the height of the pandemic, and an ineffective pipeline for new nurses. Michelle Collins, dean at the college of nursing and health at Loyola University New Orleans said this has combination of factors has led to nurses juggling dangerously high caseloads. Health care workers also experience the highest count of non-fatal workplace violence of all private sector employees.

The last major nursing strike in New York City occurred in 2023 at Mount Sinai and Montefiore. That action lasted only three days, but resulted in a deal raising pay 19% over three years at those hospitals. It also led to promised staffing increases, though the union and hospitals disagreed on the progress. Those contracts, as well as the one at NYP, expired on December 31, 2025. Starting salaries for new nurses in Manhattan reached $120,000, with overtime and experience leading some nurses to make up to $160,000. Nurses pointed to hospital executives who were paid $20 million per year in several cases.

By going on strike in 2023, the nurses also locked in minimum nurse-to-patient ratios. The years of understaffing that followed, allowed nurses to be paid extra. Nurses in the Mount Sinai Health System were awarded $4.7 million from arbitrators in 2024 in nine understaffing cases. NYP went to federal court to block a similar arbitration ruling.

=== Lead-up to the strike ===
Negotiations began months before the contracts expired, but the two sides could not come to an agreement. The nurses indicated that understaffing and safety were among their top issues in contract negotiations. They complained that their patient loads were unmanageable, and they sought better security measures in their hospitals, motivated by two recent violent incidents. One incident involved a man with a sharp object barricading himself in a Brooklyn hospital room before being killed by police. Another incident on November 13 during negotiations over security involved a gunman who threatened the staff in the Emergency Room at Mount Sanai with a gun. He was also killed by police after the staff he had just been threatening could not save him. This incident also resulted in the suspension of one nurse and formal discipline against two other nurses for "on-the-job union activity," for discussing safety concerns.

During negotiations about safety, the nurses wanted metal detectors and armed police officers, while Mount Sinai CEO Brendan Carr said the hospital was working on an artificial intelligence weapons detection program.

The union accused the hospital systems of prioritizing profits at the expense of patient needs.

In anticipation of the labor action, the hospitals canceled scheduled surgeries and transferred or discharged some patients in the days ahead of the strike. The hospitals also brought in thousands of scab workers to temporarily fill in staffing gaps. The New York Times reported that the hospitals spent $100 million to hire the temporary nurses who were paid $9,000 per week.

New York Governor Kathy Hochul said before the strike, that it "could jeopardize the lives of thousands of New Yorkers and patients." Nurses felt betrayed when on January 9th, Hochol signed an executive order declaring an emergency, allowing the hospitals to hire out-of-state nurses to work during the strike, even if they didn't have New York licenses. New York City Mayor Zohran Mamdani urged both sides to keep negotiating and reach a deal that "both honors our nurses and keeps our hospitals open."

== Timeline ==
On January 12, 2026, nurses began picketing in front of their employers, which are the largest and most prestigious privately run hospitals in the city. This action began as the city endured some of the most frigid temperatures seen in years. The Columbia Spectator reported temperatures were well below freezing, at -15 degrees Fahrenheit. Executives at New York-Presbyterian accused the union of staging a strike to "create disruption."

Nurses at Montefiore informed union representatives that since the strike began, they were unable to use the hospital pharmacy. The union filed a complaint on January 14th with the National Labor Relations Board.

On the second day of the strike, New York Attorney General Letitia James and Mayor Mamdani joined the picketline. By the end of the strike, Mamdani would appear again in support of striking workers.

On February 2, nurses marched to Governor Hochul's office to protest her continued action to undermine the strikes and alleviate the pressure on the hospitals by allowing the temporary hiring of unlicensed out-of-state nurses. Later that day she extended her emergency order allowing this practice for two days. She then extended it several more times.

The New York Times reported that three weeks into negotiations, the two sides still could not agree on security measures. Nurses at Mount Sanai wanted metal detectors and armed police officers, while hospital negotiators wanted to rely on weapon detection systems that used artificial intelligence and sensors.

On February 9, the nurses of Montefiore and Mount Sinai agreed to a tentative contract, and in the afternoon they began voting whether to approve it. In a controversial decision, NYSNA leadership also brought the contract to a vote at NewYork-Presbyterian, even though that unit's bargaining committee had already rejected the deal. Several dozen nurses protested at NYSNA headquarters against the decision to push forward the vote.

When voting concluded on Wednesday, Mount Sinai and Montefiore had "overwhelmingly" approved the new three-year contract, which ended their walkout. The nurses at NewYork-Presbyterian, however, rejected the deal with a vote of 867 to 3,099. The bargaining committee cited the commitment to increase staffing levels by 60 full-time employees to alleviate chronic understaffing, versus the 120 that they thought necessary. The rejected contract also did not include job protections that nurses requested after 2% of the workforce had been laid off in the previous year. Several nurses said they felt "betrayed" by union leadership for calling the vote anyway. Beth Loudin, a neonatal nurse and President of the NYP bargaining unit said, "You have a team that's been at this table for six months and we know our issues and we know our members really well. We know what we need to have a fair contract to go back to work. We all desperately do want to go back to work to take care of our patients." An Instagram account called @presbynurses called on its more than 6,000 followers to vote 'no' on the deal and to continue picketing Wednesday in protest.

The nurses who ended their strike gained pay raises of more than 12% over three years. They also preserved their health benefits with no additional out-of-pocket costs and gained new protections against workplace violence, including specific protections for transgender and immigrant nurses and patients. At Montefiore, their agreement also included eliminating so-called “hallway beds” and reducing emergency room overcrowding.

On February 14, the nurses at Mount Sinai and Montefliore returned to work. NYSNA president Nancy Hagans said "Nurses at NYP are still in the fight, back at the picket line, and we need their employer to get back to the table and get their nurses back in the hospital like their union siblings."

== Analysis ==
This was the largest and longest nurses strike in city history, according to the New York State Nurse Association. Nearly 15,000 nurses participated in the strike. Harry Katz, a professor of collective bargaining at Cornell University School of Industrial and Labor Relations said that both sides won and lost. Many of the nurses lost several weeks’ pay, while the hospitals spent $100 million to hire short-term scab workers and treated fewer patients than they would have otherwise. The raises in the final agreements were consistent with the raises that unions generally achieve through collective bargaining.

== See also ==
- National Nurses United
