= Mount Sinai Phillips School of Nursing =

Private nursing college in New York City, New York, U.S.

- Former names: Beth Israel School of Nursing (1903–2013); Phillips School of Nursing at Mount Sinai Beth Israel (2013–2022)
- Type: Private nursing school
- Established: 1902 (124 years ago)
- Parent institution: Mount Sinai Health System
- Accreditation: 1904 (122 years ago)
- Students: ~300
- Location: 148 East 126th Street, New York City, New York, U.S. 40.74498°N 73.99106°W
- Campus: Urban
- Website: mountsinai.org/locations/mount-sinai/pson

The Mount Sinai Phillips School of Nursing (PSON) is the private school of nursing of the Mount Sinai Health System in New York City. It was founded in 1902 as the Beth Israel School of Nursing. by the New York Board of Regents. From 2013 until 2022, it was named Phillips School of Nursing at Mount Sinai Beth Israel and in 2023 it gained its current name.

== History ==
=== Beth Israel Hospital ===
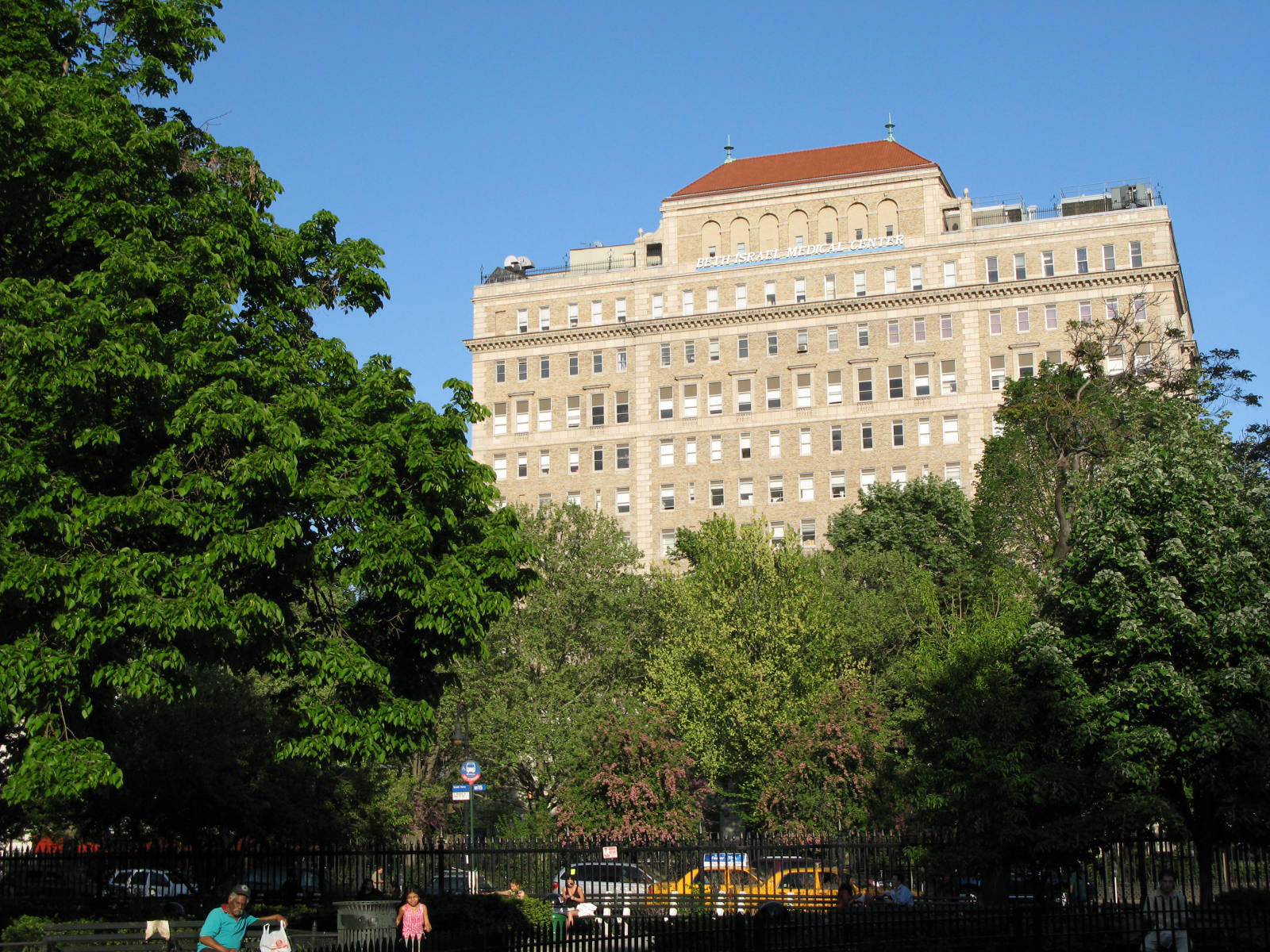
Beth Israel Medical Center as seen from Stuyvesant Square

Beth Israel Hospital – Hebrew for "House of Israel" – was founded on May 28, 1890 (closed 2025). At a time when most of the city's hospitals would not treat newly arrived immigrants, forty immigrant Orthodox Jews opened a small clinic and emergency room at 206 Broadway. The school was established in 1902 to train nurses for the nascent Beth Israel Hospital. As the demand for services at the hospital grew, the recruitment of nurses became a necessity. The school reflected a historical national movement toward nurses providing services at hospitals while they were in training.

In 2013, after decades of expansions and acquisitions, Beth Israel Medical Center joined the Mount Sinai Health System. Its nursing school – then known as the Phillips School of Nursing at Mount Sinai Beth Israel – became Mount Sinai's sole nursing school.

== Academics ==
Applications reportedly have a 67% acceptance rate and a 90% graduation rate. Nursing is the only major offered.

The school has a fifteen-month Accelerated Bachelor of Science in Nursing program (ABSN) for second-degree students and a fifteen-month Bachelor of Science Completion Program (RN-BS) for registered nurses. Both programs are accredited by the Commission on Collegiate Nursing Education. The school's Center for Continuing Education (CE) offers a variety of courses open to all nurses for CE credit as well as for professional development. Graduate-degree programs are also offered. The U.S. Department of Education reports a ratio of eight students per faculty member.

== Facility ==
In 2020, the school moved to a new location at 148 East 126th Street, between Lexington and Third Avenues, closer to the Mount Sinai Hospital and the Icahn School of Medicine. Designed by Danish architect Bjarke Ingels, the 35,000-square-foot facility includes a multi-purpose auditorium and a state-of-the-art simulation center with hospital inpatient, primary care, home care, and operating room settings.

In 2022, the school marked its 120th anniversary by inaugurating its newly built location in East Harlem and changing its name to Mount Sinai Phillips School of Nursing.

== Notable alumni ==
- Adelie Landis Bischoff, artist
- Mae Woughter Strack, nurse and artist
