= Mae Woughter Strack =

American nurse and artist

- Born: Mae L. Woughter; Tioga County, New York, U.S.
- Died: October 27, 1941; White Plains, New York, U.S.
- Education: Mount Sinai Hospital Nurses School
- Occupations: nurse, artist
- Spouse: Henry D. Strack

Mae L. Woughter Strack (died October 27, 1941) was an American nurse and artist. She was an organizer and first executive secretary of the American Heart Association, the executive secretary of the New York State Nurses Association, and a member of the National Health Council. A woodworker, her pieces were displayed at Delphic Studios in New York City.

== Early life and education ==
Strack was born in Tioga County, New York. She graduated from Mount Sinai Hospital Nurses School in New York City.

== Career ==
After completing her nursing studies, Strack served as an Army Service Corps nurse at American Base Hospital No. 1 in Vichy, France during World War I. She later organized and served as the first executive secretary of the American Heart Association. She was also a member of the National Health Council and served as executive secretary of the New York State Nurses Association.

She was also an artist. Her woodcuts were on display at Alma Reed's Delphic Studios in New York City in 1938.

== Personal life ==
She married Henry D. Strack, a New York attorney, in August 1927 at Park Avenue Baptist Church in New York City. They lived at Pelbrook Hall in Pelham, New York.

On October 27, 1941, at the age of 56, she died at White Plains Hospital.
