= Long Beach Medical Center =

- Shown in Long Beach, Long Island

Geography
- Location: 455 East Bay Drive, Long Beach, Long Island, NY, United States
- Coordinates: 40.59427°N 73.65262°W

Organization
- Type: Teaching
- Affiliated university: New York Institute of Technology College of Osteopathic Medicine, New York College of Podiatric Medicine

Services
- Emergency department: Yes
- Beds: 403 (203 acute care, 200 sub-acute/skilled nursing)

History
- Founded: 1922
- Closed: 2013

Links
- Lists: Hospitals in the United States

Long Beach Medical Center (formerly Long Beach Memorial Hospital) was a 403-bed teaching and community hospital located in Long Beach, New York. Long Beach Hospital was destroyed as a result of Hurricane Sandy. Hospital leaders are currently lobbying for state funds to rebuild the hospital. As of 2026, nearby South Nassau Communities Hospital continues to operate a freestanding emergency department on the site of the former Long Beach Hospital.

It is affiliated with the New York College of Osteopathic Medicine and the New York College of Podiatric Medicine.

Medical staff residency training records and verification are available through the Federation of State Medical Boards' Federation Credentials Verification Service (FCVS) Closed Residency program records.

== Facilities ==
=== Long Beach Medical Center Hospital ===
Long Beach Medical Center Hospital includes an emergency department, physical rehabilitation, in-patient psychiatric care, wound and hyperbaric services, and both inpatient and outpatient substance abuse services. Orthopedic care is provided in collaboration with the Hospital for Joint Disease of NYU Langone Medical Center, which is ranked by U.S. News & World Report as the nation's 9th best orthopedic hospital.

An on-site Family Care Center offers primary and specialty care for patients with limited means.

=== The Komanoff Center for Geriatric and Rehabilitative Medicine ===
A 200-bed facility providing sub-acute and skilled nursing, founded in 1974, and adjacent to the main hospital at 355 East Bay Drive, Long Beach, New York.

=== Professional Building ===
Offices for outpatient visits along with some administrative offices are located at the Long Beach Medical Center Professional Building at 249 East Park Avenue, one block south of the main campus.

=== Home Health Care ===
From offices at the Professional Building, the Home Health Care Agency provides both rehabilitative and long-term in-home care to Nassau County residents with a team of registered nurses and social workers.

== Medical Education ==
Long Beach Medical Center is affiliated with New York Institute of Technology College of Osteopathic Medicine, the nation's third largest medical school, and the New York College of Podiatric Medicine, the nation's oldest and largest school of podiatric medicine. The Medical Center offers internships, residencies and clinical clerkships. A Future Physicians program is available for high school students considering careers in medicine.

== Transportation ==
Public transportation access is available through Long Beach Bus, with connections to Nassau Inter-County Express and the Long Island Rail Road. On-site and street parking and local taxi service are also available.
