= Mount Sinai South Nassau =

- Mount Sinai Health System
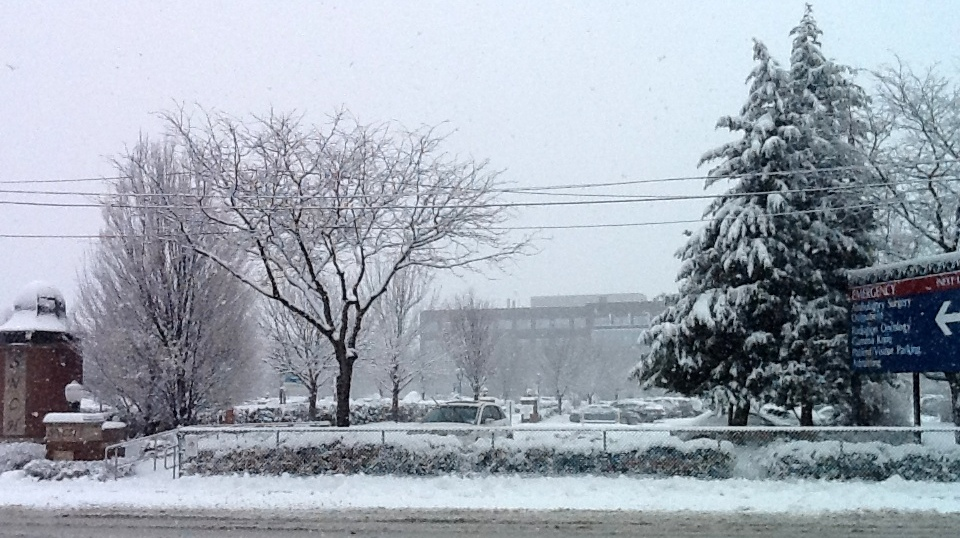
- Mount Sinai South Nassau in winter 2014

Geography
- Location: One Healthy Way, Oceanside, New York, United States
- Coordinates: 40°39′07.2″N 73°37′51.1″W

Organization
- Affiliated university: Icahn School of Medicine at Mount Sinai
- Network: Mount Sinai Health System

Services
- Emergency department: Level II Trauma Center
- Beds: 455

History
- Former name: South Nassau Communities Hospital
- Opened: 1928

Links
- Website: www.southnassau.org
- Lists: Hospitals in New York State
- Other links: http://www.mountsinaihealth.org/

Mount Sinai South Nassau, formerly South Nassau Communities Hospital is a 455 bed hospital located in Oceanside, New York. The facility was opened in 1928 and is the Long Island flagship hospital for the Mount Sinai Health System. It is also the only hospital operated by the health system outside of New York City.

== History ==
In 1996, South Nassau joined with Winthrop University Hospital to form Winthrop South Nassau University Health System. In 2003, the Winthrop South Nassau system joined NewYork-Presbyterian Hospital.

In 2014, South Nassau opened a freestanding emergency department in nearby Long Beach, after acquiring the former Long Beach Medical Center, which was severely damaged during Hurricane Sandy. Long Beach Medical Center was a full hospital before it closed, as opposed to a stand alone emergency department.

On December 4, 2018, South Nassau Communities Hospital finalized its partnership with Mount Sinai Health System, after it was given $120 million to expand its campus. On September 26, 2019, South Nassau Communities Hospital rebranded to Mount Sinai South Nassau.

On November 22, 2021, the hospital temporarily closed its emergency department due to a nurse shortage during the COVID-19 pandemic, that was caused by New York's vaccine mandate. It reopened three days later.

In March 2025, the hospital announced the completion of a $50 million dollar renovation of the emergency department. The Fennessy Family ER doubled in size from 15,000 square feet (1,400 m^{2}) to 30,000 square feet (2,800 m^{2}), has 50 private exam rooms and an updated trauma unit with 4 trauma/resuscitation bays. The emergency department expansion is one part of a larger 100,000 square feet (9,300 m^{2}) expansion of the hospital that is intended to add four floors to the facility. Once completed, the Feil Family Pavilion will have added 40 new intensive care unit beds and nine operating theaters.

== Designations ==
- ACS verified Level II Trauma Center
- Level II Perinatal Center
- Primary Stroke Center
