= The Valley Hospital =

Geography
- Location: 4 Valley Health Plaza; Paramus, New Jersey; U.S.
- Coordinates: 40.9837°N 74.1008°W

Services
- Standards: JCAHO
- Emergency department: Yes
- Beds: 451

Links
- Website: http://www.valleyhealth.com

The Valley Hospital is a 370-bed, acute-care, not-for-profit hospital in Paramus, New Jersey, United States, in the heart of Bergen County. Valley staff includes more than 1,100 physicians, 3,700 employees, and 3,000 volunteers. In 2020, Valley recorded 41,345 admissions, 51,792 emergency department visits, and 3,528 births.

The Valley Hospital is part of Valley Health System, which also includes Valley Home Care and Valley Medical Group. On April 14, 2024, the hospital was formally moved to a specially designed new facility in Paramus with all private inpatient rooms, from nearby Ridgewood, where Valley Health System maintains a large, state-of-the art outpatient complex.

== Healthcare services ==
Services available at The Valley Hospital include:

- The Valley Heart and Vascular Institute
- The Bolger Emergency Department
- The Blumenthal Cancer Center
- The Total Joint Replacement Center
- The Valley Hospital Breast Center
- The Center for Childbirth (including a Neonatal Intensive Care Unit)
- Maternal-Fetal Medicine services
- Pediatrics (including a pediatric emergency room and developmental pediatrics)
- The Neuroscience Center of Excellence
- The Same-Day Services Center
- The Valley Fertility Center
- The Center For Minimally Invasive and Robotic Surgery
- The Center for Metabolic and Weight Loss Surgery
- The Center for Sleep Medicine
- The Gamma Knife Center
- Mobile Intensive Care Unit (MICU)

== Locations ==
=== Main Hospital Campus (4 Valley Health Plaza, Paramus) ===
The Valley Hospital's main campus houses the hospital's inpatient medical/surgical services and emergency department, as well as cardiovascular, orthopedic, oncology, mother/baby and neurology services.

=== Luckow Pavilion (1 Valley Health Plaza, Paramus) ===
The Robert and Audrey Luckow Pavilion is home to the George R. Jaqua Same Day Services Center, the Daniel and Gloria Blumenthal Cancer Center, the Valley Hospital Fertility Center and the Valley Health Pharmacy.

=== Kraft Center (15 Essex Road, Paramus) ===
Support offices for The Valley Hospital, Valley Home Care and Valley Medical Group are located at The Dorothy B. Kraft Center.

=== Kireker Center for Child Development (140 E. Ridgewood Ave., Paramus) ===
The Center for Child Development offers care for children with special needs, including developmental pediatrics, rehabilitation therapy, audiology services, feeding therapy, autism programs and more.

== Affiliations ==
In December 2014, Valley announced its affiliation with the Mount Sinai Health System. The academic partnership brings new research opportunities to Valley, with the goal of enhancing the hospital's clinical services and attracting leading physicians. Both institutions will remain independent.

In April 2015, Valley announced its affiliation with Cleveland Clinic's Sydell and Arnold Miller Family Heart & Vascular Institute. Through this affiliation, Valley has become a member of the Cleveland Clinic Cardiovascular Specialty Network. Both institutions will share best practices in cardiac care, coordinate care, and develop programs to improve quality of care and patient safety.
