= Mount Sinai Hospital (Brooklyn) =

Hospital in Brooklyn

- Mount Sinai Health System
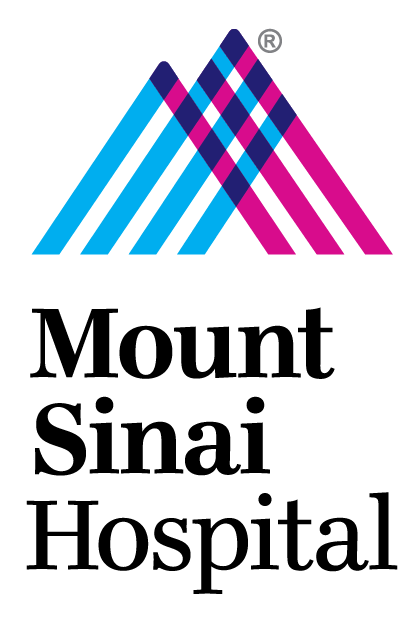

Geography
- Location: 3201 Kings Highway, Midwood, Brooklyn, New York City, New York, United States
- Coordinates: 40°37′8″N 73°56′34″W

Organization
- Type: Private
- Network: Mount Sinai Health System

Services
- Beds: 212

History
- Founded: 1955

Links
- Website: www.mountsinai.org/locations/mount-sinai
- Lists: Hospitals in New York State
- Other links: Hospitals in Brooklyn

The Mount Sinai Hospital located in Brooklyn (also known as Mount Sinai Brooklyn) was founded in 1955 as a private hospital. Like nearby New York Community Hospital, the 3201 Kings Highway facility with a history of name changes is One Address, Many Hospitals.

As with Community, its Kosher supervision is under Vaad of Flatbush.

== History ==
Samuel L. Berson opened King Highway Hospital as a proprietary in 1955.

Initially, in 1954, the 3201 Kings Highway building was a nursing home. It became a hospital in 1955, when Berson purchased the building, which he sold in 1995. The names used at this location include:

- Kings Highway Hospital (1955)
- Kings Highway Hospital Center
- Beth Israel Hospital Kings Highway Division (1995)
- Beth Israel Hospital Brooklyn (2012)
- Mount Sinai Hospital Beth Israel Brooklyn (2014)
- Mount Sinai Hospital Brooklyn (2015)
