= Joshua B. Bederson =

American neurosurgeon

- Education: University of California, San Francisco
- Occupation: Neurosurgeon
- Employer: Mount Sinai Health System
- Title: System Chair of Neurosurgery at Mount Sinai Health System; Co-Founder and Executive Director of Mount Sinai BioDesign

Joshua B. Bederson is an American neurosurgeon specializing in skull-base and cerebrovascular surgery. He is the Leonard I. Malis, MD/Corinne and Joseph Graber Professor of Neurosurgery and System Chair of Neurosurgery at the Mount Sinai Health System in New York City. He is also co-founder and Executive Director of Mount Sinai BioDesign, a biomedical innovation and surgical technology incubator within the Icahn School of Medicine at Mount Sinai. Bederson is a Fellow of the American College of Surgeons.

His clinical expertise includes surgical treatment of skull-base pathology and cerebrovascular disorders, including meningiomas of all types, trigeminal neuralgia, pituitary tumors, acoustic neuromas, Chiari malformations, cavernous malformations, hemifacial spasms, spinal cord tumors, neurofibromatosis, Cushing's disease, craniopharyngiomas, intracerebral hemorrhage, brain aneurysms, hydrocephalus, and subdural hematomas.

Bederson has performed more than 6,500 neurosurgical procedures at Mount Sinai and has authored 237 publications.

== Education and post-doctoral training ==
Bederson graduated Phi Beta Kappa from Cornell University in 1979 with a degree in psychology, where he was the Ivy League Gymnastics All-Around Champion for three consecutive seasons from 1976 to 1978. He earned his Doctor of Medicine (MD) degree from the University of California, San Francisco (UCSF). He was a member of USCF's Alpha Omega Alpha Medical Honor Society.

In 1984, Bederson took a year away from medical training to study sculpture in New York University's Master's program, and to exhibit his artwork, while simultaneously conducting medical research.

He completed his surgical internship and neurosurgical residency at UCSF between 1984 and 1990. During residency, Bederson received the Henry B. Newman Award from the San Francisco Neurological Society and the Resident Award from the International Microsurgical Society in 1986.

His postgraduate subspecialty training included a neuropathology fellowship at the University of Torino in Italy in 1987, an advanced microvascular fellowship training under Gazi Yaşargil, at Zurich University Hospital in Switzerland, and a cerebrovascular surgery fellowship at the Barrow Neurological Institute in Phoenix, Arizona, under Robert F. Spetzler.

== Career ==
Bederson joined Mount Sinai Medical Center in 1992 as its first dedicated cerebrovascular neurosurgeon. Bederson founded the institution's Cerebrovascular Disorders Clinical Program, establishing the first basic science laboratory within Mount Sinai's Department of Neurosurgery, developing experimental models of stroke and subarachnoid hemorrhage. In 2002, he became the first neurosurgeon at The Mount Sinai Hospital to receive a National Institutes of Health (NIH) R01 grant as principal investigator.

He served as Assistant Professor of Neurosurgery from 1992 to 1996, Associate Professor from 1996 to 2001, and Professor of Neurosurgery beginning in 2001. From 2002 to 2008, he also served as Director of the Neurosurgery Residency Program. In 2001, Bederson was appointed Vice Chairman of the Department of Neurosurgery at Mount Sinai Health System, a role he held until 2008, when he became System Chair of Neurosurgery.

Bederson co-founded the Skull Base Surgery Center at Mount Sinai, dedicated to the evaluation and treatment of benign and malignant tumors of the skull base.

Under Bederson's leadership, the Department of Neurosurgery at the Icahn School of Medicine at Mount Sinai has expanded to become the third-largest neurosurgery department in the United States by faculty size and the seventh-largest by surgical volume. Since 2020, the department has consecutively ranked #1 in New York State for NIH funding in neurosurgery.

In 2015, Bederson served as the President of the New York Society of the New York Society for Neurosurgery, and in 2006, he was appointed Chair of the American Association of Neurological Surgeons/Congress of Neurosurgeons Cerebrovascular Section. In 2019, Bederson was honored at the AANS Annual Scientific Meeting as the Cerebrovascular Section's M. Gazi Yasargil Lecturer. Bederson was Chair of the American Heart Association's Writing Group, publishing the guidelines on subarachnoid hemorrhage and stroke treatment. He is also a member of the Society of Neurological Surgery.

Bederson received the Mount Sinai Health System's Jacobi Medallion in 2020, one of the institution's highest faculty honors. In 1990, he received the John R. Greene Research Award from the Arizona Neurological Society. In 2004, he was recognized by the Cornell University Class of 1979 with a distinguished alumni award. He has been recognized since 2009 as a Top Doctor by Castle Connolly and New York Magazine.

== Mount Sinai BioDesign and Neurotechnology ==
In 2015, Bederson launched Mount Sinai's Brain Neurosurgery Simulation Core to develop advanced surgical training and simulation technologies. It evolved into Mount Sinai BioDesign in 2017, co-founded by Bederson and Anthony Costa, within the Department of Neurosurgery. Mount Sinai BioDesign supports startup formation, patent development, surgical simulation platforms, neurotechnology research, and translational biomedical innovation. The program has led to the development of spinout companies, including PharyVac Surgical Technology, MitralPrint, and Monogram Orthopedics, which originated within Mount Sinai BioDesign before becoming independent entities. It has also supported the development of clinical trials, user-feedback studies, U.S. Food and Drug Administration submissions, and novel algorithms through collaborations with organizations including Elementa Labs, Precision Neuroscience Laboratories, Mount Sinai Innovation Partners, and the BioMedical Engineering and Imaging Institute.

Led by Bederson, Mount Sinai BioDesign was awarded an $11.6 million grant in 2022 from the New York City Economic Development Corporation (NYCEDC) to establish the Comprehensive Center for Surgical Innovation (CCSI), focused on the development and commercialization of surgical technologies. The center's grand opening is scheduled for summer 2026.

On November 2, 2023, at The Mount Sinai Hospital, Bederson led the first clinical use of the Modus X robotic exoscope system for neurosurgery.

In 2024, in collaboration with the brain-computer interface (BCI) company Precision Neuroscience, Bederson set a world record using four 1,024-electrode arrays (4,096 electrodes total) to record from the human brain. The following year, he became the first to implant Precision Neuroscience's device for extended postoperative use in brain mapping and testing, following U.S. Food and Drug Administration clearance for postoperative monitoring of up to 30 days.

Forbes recognized Bederson as a leader in BCI following his establishment of the annual New York BCI Symposium, hosted by Mount Sinai BioDesign and the Department of Neurosurgery at the Icahn School of Medicine at Mount Sinai, and held at the New York Academy of Medicine. He served as moderator for the inaugural meetings in 2024 and 2025, which featured presentations and panel discussions from experts in neurosurgery, neuroscience, biomedical engineering, and federal regulatory agencies.

Bederson participated in a Mount Sinai panel at the Aspen Ideas Festival in 2024 exploring the current state of BCIs, their applications, and the future of the technology.

== Personal life ==
Bederson is the son of Benjamin Bederson, a physicist who worked on the Manhattan Project.

During his surgical internship, Bederson met and married Isabelle M. Germano, who is Professor of Neurosurgery, Neurology, Oncological Sciences, Radiation Oncology, and Global Health at the Icahn School of Medicine at Mount Sinai. They have two daughters who are both physicians.

== Books ==
- Bederson JB (Editor) Subarachnoid Hemorrhage: Pathophysiology and Treatment. 1996, American Association of Neurological Surgeons Press, Park Ridge, Illinois, 283 Pages. Library of Congress ISBN 1-879284-43-X.
- Bederson JB, Tuhrim S (Editors), Bederson JB, Tuhrin, S (Authors) Treatment of Carotid Disease: A Practitioner's Manual. 1998, American Association of Neurological Surgeons Press, Park Ridge, Illinois, 256 pages. Library of Congress ISBN 1-879284-55-3.

== Book chapters ==
Partial list:

- Bederson JB, Wilson CB. "Surgical Treatment of Olfactory Groove Meningiomas." In: AANS Neurosurgical Operative Atlas, pages 77–85, 1991.
- Bederson JB. "Pathophysiology and Animal Models of Dural Arteriovenous Malformations." In: Awad I and Barrow D, eds, Dural Arteriovenous Malformations. American Association of Neurological Surgeons, Park Ridge, Illinois, pp 23–34, 1993.
- Bederson JB. "Hemodynamics of Giant Intracranial Aneurysms." In: Awad I and Barrow D, eds, Giant Intracranial Aneurysms. American Association of Neurological Surgeons, Park Ridge, Illinois, pp 13–22, 1995.
- Bederson JB. "Trigeminal Neuralgia." In: Rakel RE (ed), Conn's Current Therapy. WB Saunders Co, Phila, PA, pp 900–902, 1996.
- Bederson JB. "Mechanisms of Acute Brain Injury after Subarachnoid Hemorrhage." In: Bederson JB (ed), Subarachnoid Hemorrhage: Pathophysiology and Treatment. American Association of Neurological Surgeons Press, Park Ridge, Illinois, pp 61–76, 1996.
- Ullman J, Bederson JB. "Spinal Arteriovenous Malformations: Pathophysiology and Hemodynamics." In: Barrow D, Awad I (eds), Spinal Vascular Malformations. American Association of Neurological Surgeons Press, Park Ridge, Illinois, pp 37–43, 1998.
- Bederson JB, Batjer HH, Stieg PE, Zabramski JM, Lee KC. "Management of Severe Subarachnoid Hemorrhage." In: Fisher WS (ed), Perspectives in Neurological Surgery. (9):111–128, 1998.
- Tuhrim S, Bederson JB. "Patient Selection for Carotid Endarterectomy." In: Bederson JB, Tuhrim S, (eds), Treatment of Carotid Disease: A Practitioner's Manual. American Association of Neurological Surgeons Press, Park Ridge, Illinois, pp 129–142, 1998.
- Bederson JB. "Carotid Endarterectomy: Description, Complications, and Adjuncts." In: Bederson JB, Tuhrim S (eds), Treatment of Carotid Disease: A Practitioner's Manual., American Association of Neurological Surgeons Press, Park Ridge, Illinois, pp 167–180, 1998.
- Bederson JB. "Cerebrovascular Applications of Image Guidance." In: Germano IM (ed), Advances in Image-Guided Brain and Spine Surgery. Thieme, New York, NY, pp 121–131, 2002.

== Recent Publications ==
Partial list:

- Akkara Y, Afreen R, Lemonick M, Paz SG, Rifi Z, Tosto J, Putrino D, Mocco J, Bederson J, Dangayach N, Kellner CP (December 17, 2024). "Standardizing Domains and Metrics of Stroke Recovery: A Systematic Review". Brain Sciences. 14 (12): 1267. doi:10.3390/brainsci14121267. PMC 11674257. PMID 39766466.
- Devarajan A, Seah C, Zhang JY, Vasan V, Feng R, Chapman EK, Shigematsu T, Bederson J, Shrivastava RK (February 2025). "A four-hit mechanism is sufficient for meningioma development". Journal of Neuro-Oncology. 171 (3): 599–607. doi:10.1007/s11060-024-04877-y. PMID 39586894.
- Odland IC, Feng R, Matsoukas S, Huo L, Faulkner DE, Tabani H, Bederson J, Rapoport BI (March 25, 2025). "In Reply: Angiographic Features of Meningiomas Predicting Extent of Preoperative Embolization". Neurosurgery. 96 (6): e129–e130. doi:10.1227/neu.0000000000003407. PMID 40130872.
- Nguyen P, Yokoda RT, Hossain Q, Bederson JB, Richardson TE (April 11, 2025). "Solitary fibrous tumor-meningioma collision tumor with 18 years of follow-up". Journal of Neuropathology & Experimental Neurology. 84 (10): 950–953. doi:10.1093/jnen/nlaf037. PMID 40213899.
- Dedhia M, Devarajan A, Rao A, Monnig E, Unterberger A, Feng R, Chapman EK, Tong AP, Dullea J, Gill CM, Rutland JW, Pain M, Bederson J, Shrivastava RK (April 11, 2025). "Somatic AKT1 Mutations May Confer Increased Risk of Preoperative Seizures in Meningiomas". Neurosurgery. 97 (4): 893–900. doi:10.1227/neu.0000000000003445. PMID 40214250.
- Tang M, Devarajan A, Huo L, Chung T, Vasan V, Zhang JY, Feng R, Chapman E, Bederson J, Shrivastava RK (August 2025). "Identifying associated comorbidities in the development of trigeminal neuralgia: A propensity-matched analysis of the National Inpatient Sample". Clinical Neurology and Neurosurgery. 255 108985. doi:10.1016/j.clineuro.2025.108985. PMID 40451122.
- Ramer Bass I, Ferreira de Carvalho J, Umphlett M, Shuman W, Kirschenbaum A, Milgrim E, Milgrim L, Bederson J, Post K, Shrivastava R, Levine AC (October 17, 2025). "Immunohistochemical Comparison of Dopamine-2 Receptor Expression in Resistant and Non-Resistant Prolactinomas". Journal of Clinical Medicine. 14 (20): 7344. doi:10.3390/jcm14207344. PMC 12565039. PMID 41156214.
- Ezzat B, Afreen R, Kalagara R, Melo L, Morozov M, Bose J, Poyraz FC, Mocco J, Bederson JB, Kellner CP, Dangayach NS, Mount Sinai NEMAT Research Group (December 2025). "Neuroemergencies Management and Transfers System: Safety and Efficacy in Intracerebral Hemorrhage Patient Transfer During COVID-19 Pandemic". World Neurosurgery. 204 124596. doi:10.1016/j.wneu.2025.124596. PMID 41429739.
- Feng R, Richter F, Mari E, Gleason A, Le C, Kellner CP, Shrivastava RK, Fields M, Rapoport BI, Bederson JB, Schadt EE, Glicksberg BS, Dangayach NS (January 14, 2026). "Artificial Intelligence Monitoring of Neurological Status From Patient Videos in the Neuroscience Intensive Care Unit". Neurosurgery. doi:10.1227/neu.0000000000003899. PMID 41532764.
- Odland IC, Huo L, Feng R, Tabani H, Durbin J, Perillo T, Goldman D, Delman B, Umphlett M, Kellner CP, Shigematsu T, Majidi S, De Leacy RA, Fifi JT, Berenstein A, Mocco J, Bederson JB, Shrivastava RK, Rapoport BI (February 9, 2026). "Standalone Meningioma Embolization: A Systematic Review". Neurosurgery. doi:10.1227/neu.0000000000003933. PMID 41660991.
- Cummins DD, Barth K, Ho E, Fink Skular A, Dister J, Rapoport B, Saez I, Bederson JB (February 9, 2026). "High-resolution cortical mapping within and across the central sulcus using 1024-electrode micro-electrocorticography arrays: illustrative case". Journal of Neurosurgery: Case Lessons. 11 (6) CASE25534. doi:10.3171/CASE25534. PMC 12884823. PMID 41662697.
