= Max Hodak =

American entrepreneur and biomedical engineer

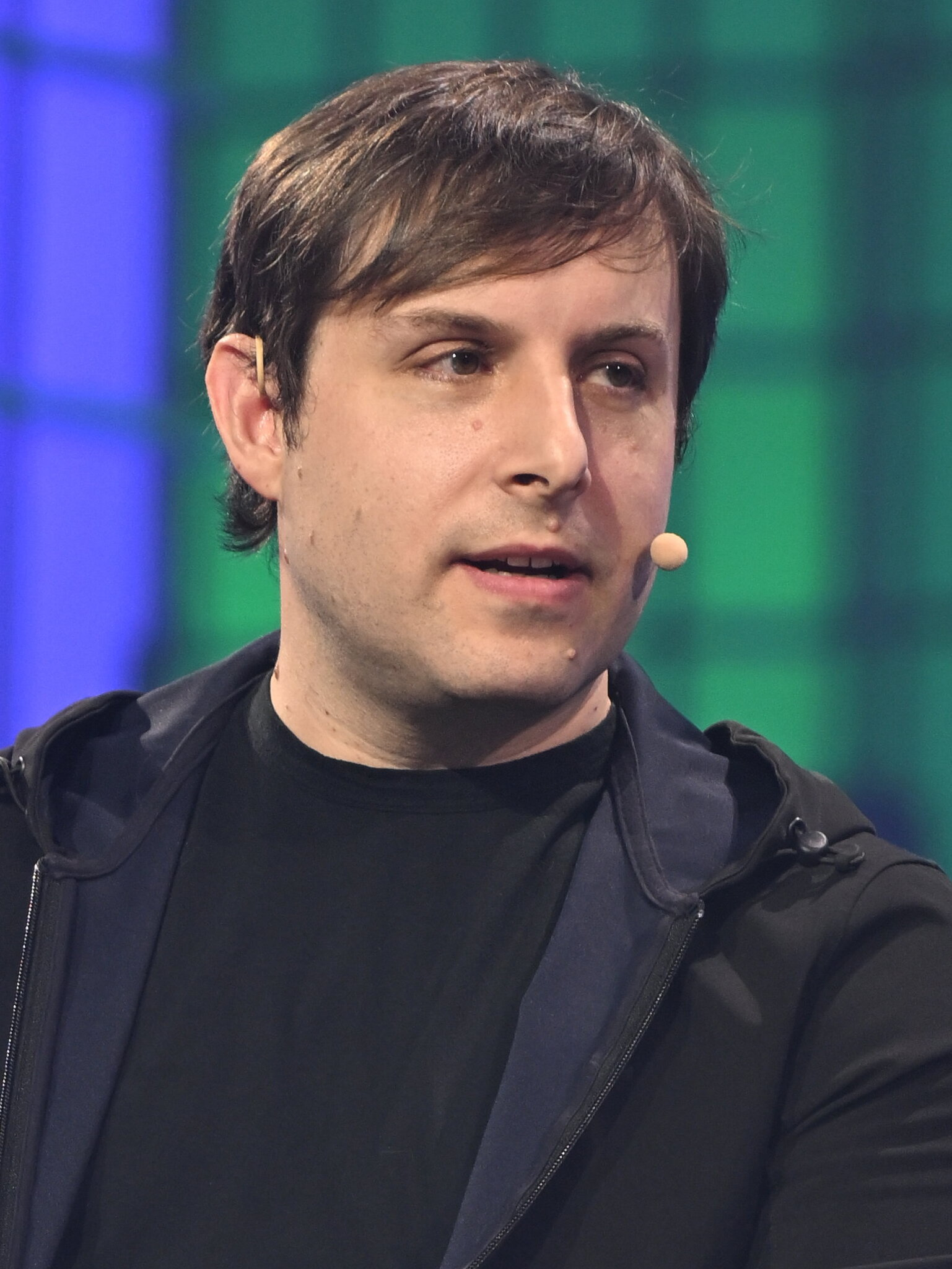
- Hodak in 2025
- Born: New York State, U.S.
- Education: Duke University
- Occupations: Entrepreneur, biomedical engineer
- Known for: Co-founder of Neuralink; founder of Science Corporation

Max Hodak is an American entrepreneur and biomedical engineer. He is the founder and CEO of Science Corporation, a company that develops advanced neural technologies to restore vision and cognition.

== Early life and education ==
Hodak was born in New York State. He went to Duke University, where he majored in biomedical engineering. There, he worked at the brain-computer interface (BCI) lab run by Miguel Nicolelis. He graduated in 2012.

== Career ==
While a student at Duke, Hodak founded MyFit, a college-matching and analytics platform that assisted high school students and their families by predicting their chance of getting into a college and helping them improve it. It was acquired by Naviance in October 2010.

In 2012, Hodak founded Transcriptic, a robotic cloud laboratory for life sciences that allows researchers to run experiments remotely via code.

In 2016, Hodak co-founded Neuralink. He served as president until early 2021.

In 2021, Hodak founded Science Corporation.
