= Blindsight (disambiguation) =

Blindsight is a neurological phenomenon.

Blindsight may also refer to:

- Blindsight (Cook novel), a 1992 novel written by Robin Cook
- Blindsight (film), a 2006 documentary film directed by Lucy Walker
- Blindsight (Watts novel), a 2006 novel written by Peter Watts
- Blindsight (Neuralink), a medical device developed by Neuralink
- Blindsight, a 2005 novel written by Maurice Gee
- Blindsighted, a 2002 novel written by Karin Slaughter
