= Washington–Baltimore combined statistical area =

- Combined Statistical Area
- Washington–Baltimore–Arlington, DC–VA–MD–WV–PA Combined Statistical Area
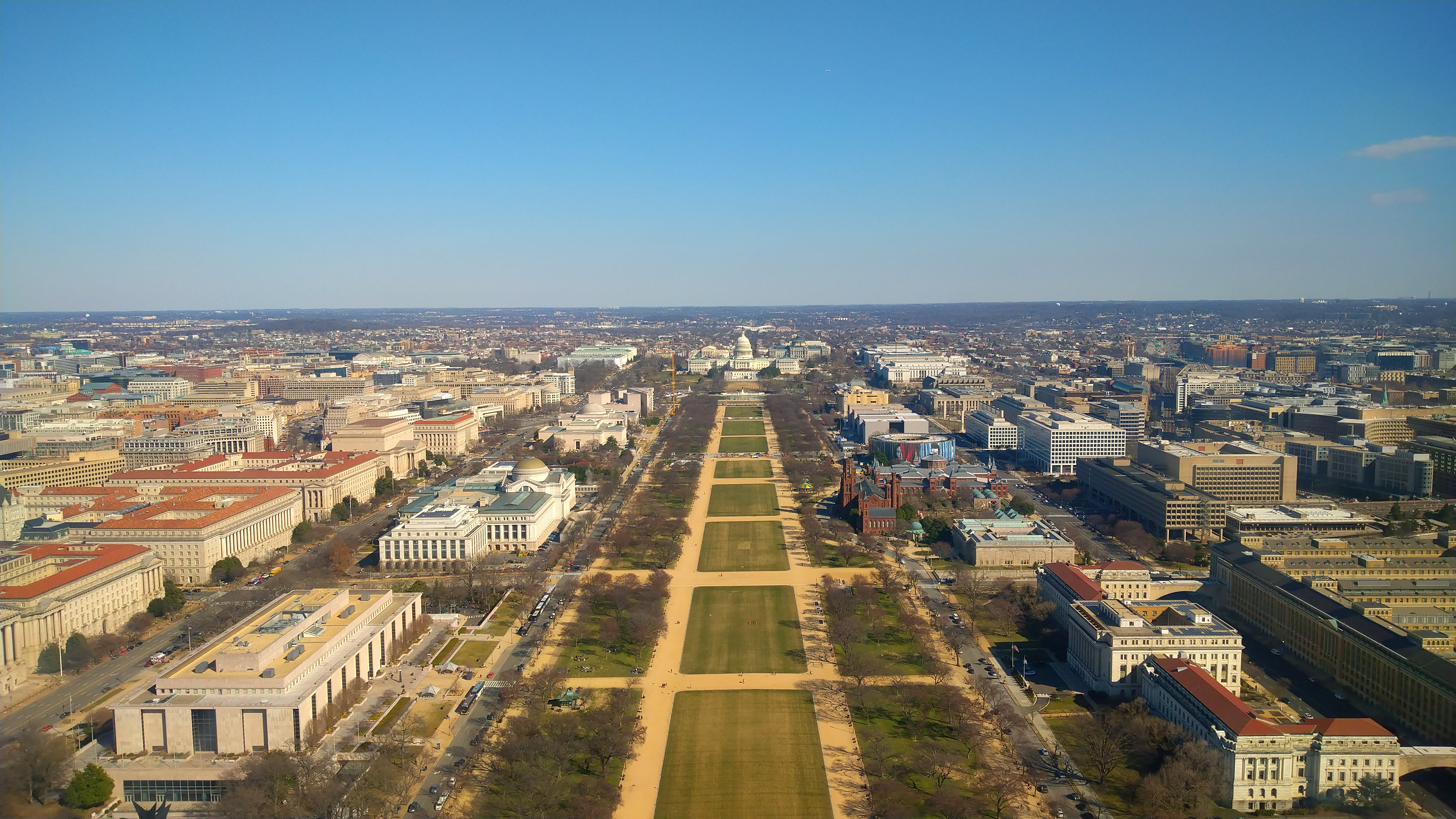
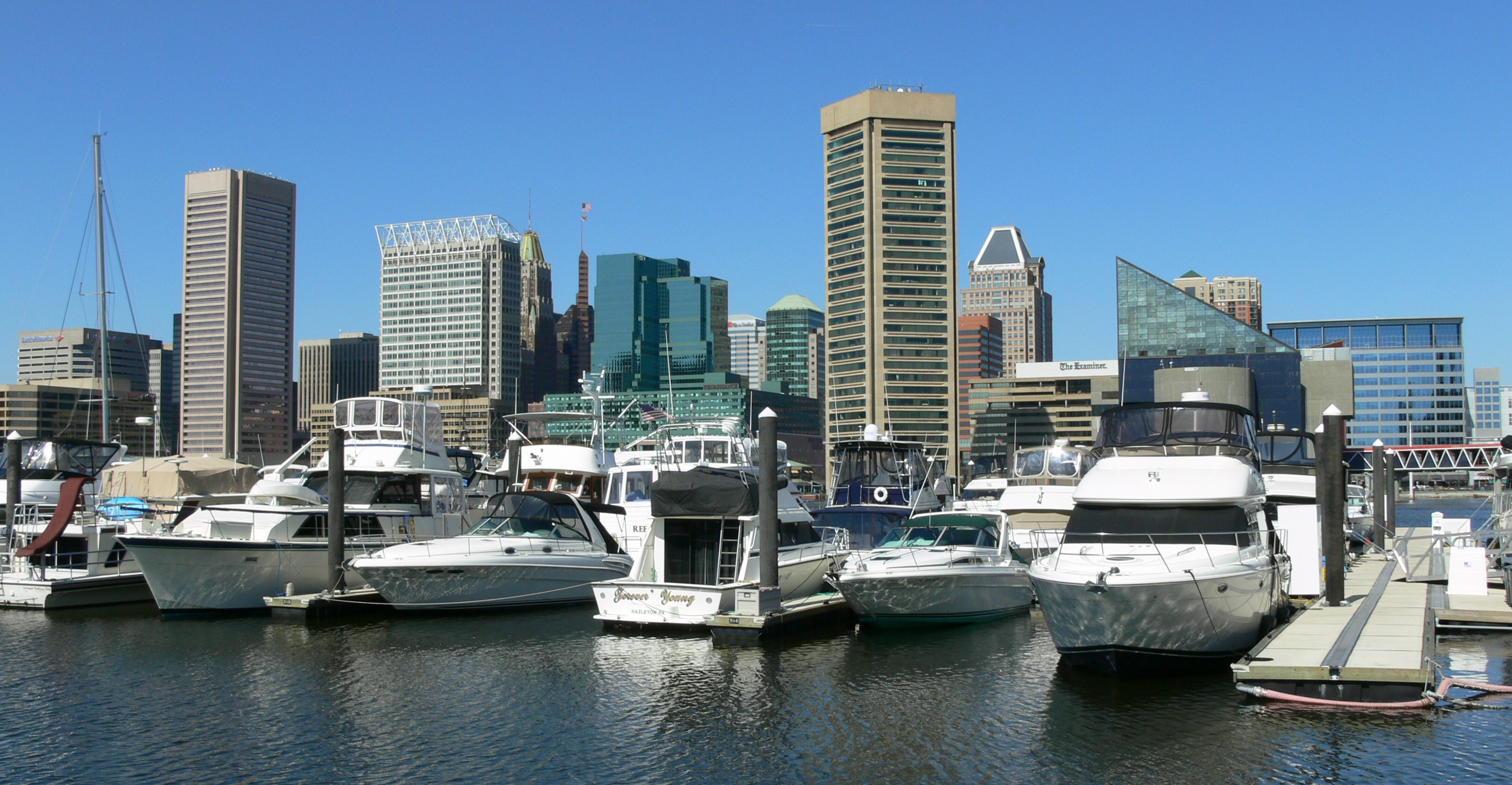
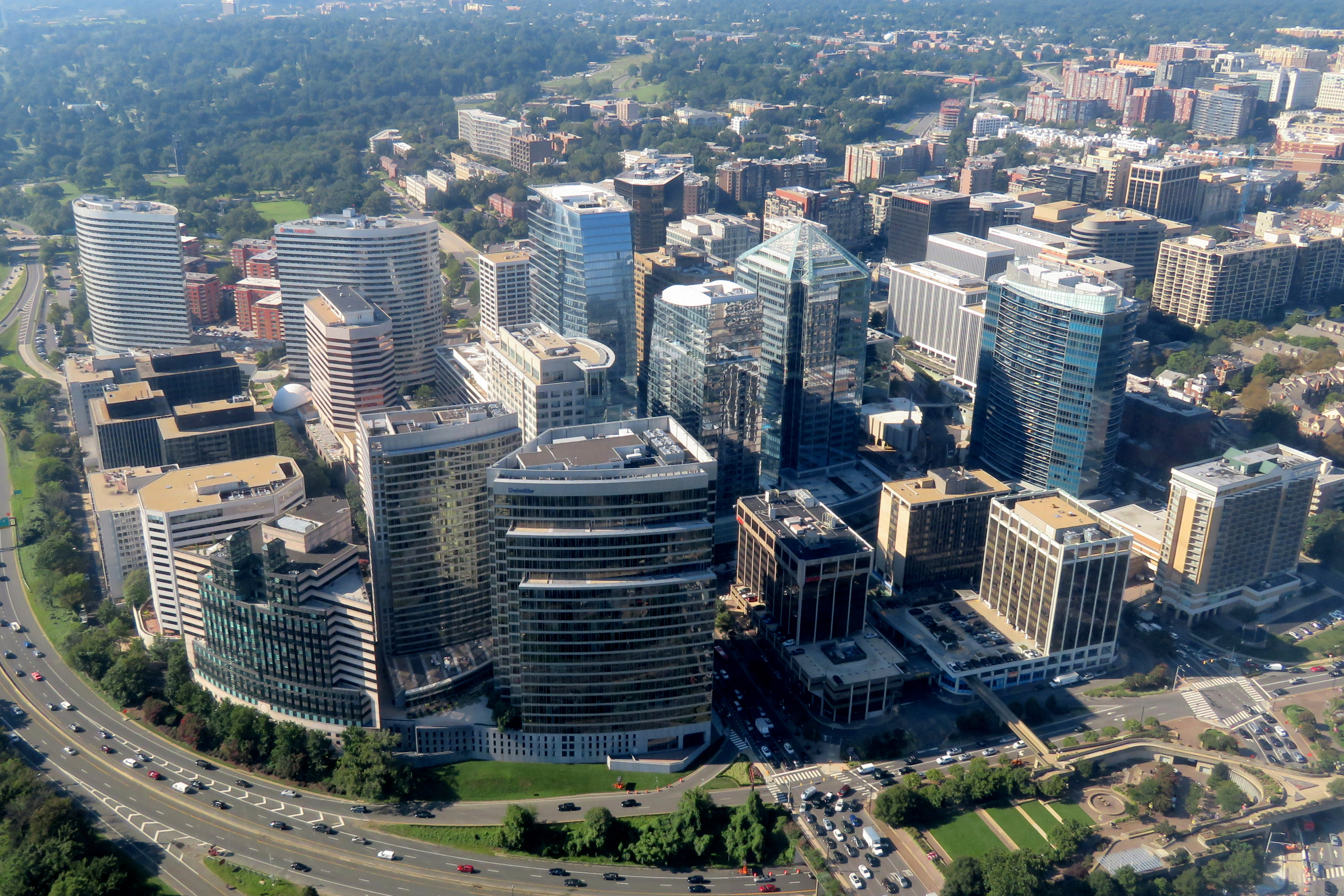
- National Mall in Washington, D.C. Inner Harbor in Baltimore Skyline of Rosslyn in Arlington County
Interactive Map of Washington–Baltimore–Arlington,
DC–VA–MD–WV–PA CSA
Washington, DC
Baltimore, MD
Washington–Arlington–Alexandria MSA
Baltimore–Columbia–Towson, MD MSA
Hagerstown–Martinsburg, MD–WV MSA
Lexington Park, MD MSA
Chambersburg, PA MSA
Winchester, VA–WV MSA
Easton, MD μSA
Lake of the Woods, VA μSA
Cambridge, MD μSA
- Coordinates: 38.97°N 77.32°W
- Country: United States
- State or area: Washington, D.C.; Maryland; Virginia; West Virginia; Pennsylvania
- Constituent metropolitan & micropolitan areas: Core areas: Washington Metropolitan Area; Baltimore Metropolitan Area; Outlying areas: Hagerstown–Martinsburg Metropolitan Area; California–Lexington Park, Maryland Metropolitan Area; Chambersburg–Waynesboro, PA Metropolitan Area; Winchester, Virginia–West Virginia Metropolitan Area; Easton, Maryland Micropolitan Area; Lake of the Woods, Virginia Micropolitan Area; Cambridge, Maryland Micropolitan Area
- Principal cities: Washington, D.C.; In Maryland: Baltimore; Annapolis; Bethesda; Bowie; Columbia; Easton; Frederick; Gaithersburg; Hagerstown; Lexington Park; Rockville; Silver Spring; Towson; In Pennsylvania: Chambersburg; Waynesboro; In Virginia: Arlington; Alexandria; Fairfax; Falls Church; Fredericksburg; Manassas; Manassas Park; Reston; Tysons; Winchester; In West Virginia: Martinsburg

Population (2023)
  - CSA: 10,069,592 (3rd)

GDP
  - CSA: $1.028 trillion (2023)
- Time zone: UTC-5 (EST)
  - Summer (DST): UTC-4 (EDT)
- Area codes: 202/771, 301/240/227, 304/681, 410/443/667, 540/826, 703/571, 717/223

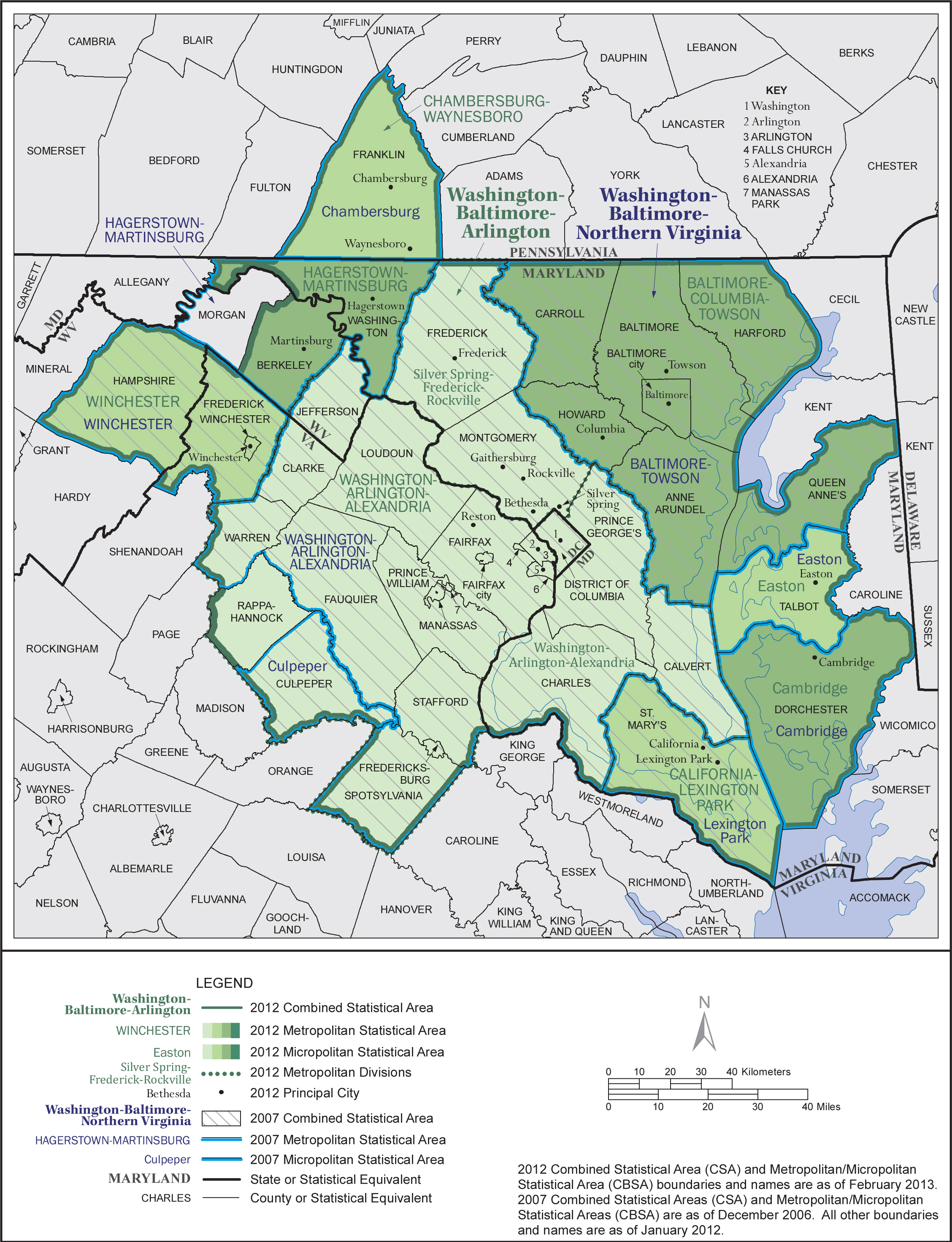
Map of the 2012 OMB-designated Washington-Baltimore-Arlington, DC-MD-VA-WV-PA Combined Statistical Area

The Washington–Baltimore combined metropolitan statistical area is a statistical area, including the overlapping metropolitan areas of Washington, D.C., and Baltimore. The region includes Central Maryland, Northern Virginia, three counties in the Eastern Panhandle of West Virginia, and one county in south-central Pennsylvania. It is the most educated, highest-income, and third-most populous combined statistical area in the United States behind New York City–Newark, NJ and Los Angeles–Long Beach.

The area is designated by the Office of Management and Budget (OMB) as the Washington–Baltimore–Arlington, DC–MD–VA–WV–PA Combined Statistical Area. It is composed primarily of two major metropolitan statistical areas (MSAs), the Washington–Arlington–Alexandria, DC–VA–MD–WV MSA and the Baltimore–Columbia–Towson, Maryland Metropolitan Statistical Area. Five smaller urban areas not contiguous to the main urban area but having strong commuting ties with the main area are included in the metropolitan area: Hagerstown–Martinsburg, Maryland–West Virginia MSA, the Chambersburg–Waynesboro, Pennsylvania MSA, the Winchester, VA–WV MSA, the California–Lexington Park, Maryland MSA, and the Easton, Maryland micropolitan statistical area (μSA).

Some counties, such as Caroline and King George County, Virginia, are not officially designated by OMB as members of this metropolitan area but still consider themselves members anyway. This is mostly due to their proximity to the area, the size of their commuter population, and by the influence of local broadcasting stations. The population of the entire Washington–Baltimore Combined Statistical Area as of the 2020 census was 9,973,383. The area's most-populous city is Washington, D.C., with a population of 689,545, and the area's most populous county is Fairfax County, Virginia, with a population of 1,150,309.

== Components of the combined statistical area ==
The counties and independent cities and their groupings that comprise the area are listed below with their 2012 population estimates. Central counties/cities (designated as such by OMB) for each MSA are shown in italics.

- Washington–Arlington–Alexandria, DC–VA–MD–WV Metropolitan Area (5,860,342)
  - Arlington–Alexandria–Reston, VA–WV Metropolitan Division
    - Arlington County, Virginia
    - Clarke County, Virginia
    - Culpeper County, Virginia
    - Fairfax County, Virginia
    - Fauquier County, Virginia
    - Loudoun County, Virginia
    - Prince William County, Virginia
    - Rappahannock County, Virginia
    - Spotsylvania County, Virginia
    - Stafford County, Virginia
    - Warren County, Virginia
    - Alexandria, Virginia
    - Fairfax, Virginia
    - Falls Church, Virginia
    - Fredericksburg, Virginia
    - Manassas, Virginia
    - Manassas Park, Virginia
    - Jefferson County, West Virginia
  - Frederick–Gaithersburg–Bethesda, MD Metropolitan Division (1,244,291)
    - Frederick County, Maryland
    - Montgomery County, Maryland
  - Washington, DC–MD Metropolitan Division (4,616,051)
    - Washington, District of Columbia
    - Charles County, Maryland
    - Prince George's County, Maryland
- Baltimore–Columbia–Towson, MD Metropolitan Area (2,753,149)
  - Baltimore City
  - Anne Arundel County
  - Baltimore County
  - Carroll County
  - Harford County
  - Howard County
  - Queen Anne's County
- Hagerstown–Martinsburg, MD–WV Metropolitan Area (256,278)
  - Washington County, Maryland
  - Berkeley County, West Virginia
  - Morgan County, West Virginia
- Chambersburg, PA Metropolitan Area (151,275)
  - Franklin County, Pennsylvania
- Winchester, VA–WV Metropolitan Area (130,907)
  - Frederick County, Virginia
  - Winchester city, Virginia
  - Hampshire County, West Virginia
- California–Lexington Park, MD Metropolitan Area (108,987)
  - Calvert County
  - St. Mary's County
- Easton, MD Micropolitan Area (38,098)
  - Talbot County, Maryland
- Lake of the Woods, VA Micropolitan Area
  - Orange County, Virginia
- Cambridge, MD Micropolitan Area
  - Dorchester County, Maryland

== Regional organizations ==
=== Metropolitan Washington Council of Governments ===
Founded in 1957, the Metropolitan Washington Council of Governments (MWCOG) is a regional organization of 23 Washington-area local governments, members of the Maryland and Virginia state legislatures, the U.S. Senate, and the U.S. House of Representatives. MWCOG provides a forum for discussion and the development of regional responses to issues regarding the environment, transportation, public safety, homeland security, affordable housing, community planning, and economic development.

The National Capital Region Transportation Planning Board, a component of MWCOG, is the federally designated Metropolitan Planning Organization for the metropolitan Washington area.

=== Baltimore Metropolitan Council ===
The Baltimore Metropolitan Council is the equivalent organization for the Baltimore portion of the combined Baltimore–Washington metropolitan area. The BMC, which was created in 1992 as the successor to the Regional Planning Council and Baltimore Regional Council of Governments, consists of the Baltimore region's elected executives, representing Baltimore City and Anne Arundel, Baltimore, Carroll, Harford and Howard counties.

The Baltimore Regional Transportation Board is the federally recognized Metropolitan Planning Organization for transportation planning in the Baltimore region.

== Principal cities ==
=== Major cities ===
- Baltimore, Maryland
- Washington, D.C.

=== Baltimore area ===
- Baltimore
- Aberdeen, Maryland
- Annapolis, Maryland
- Arbutus, Maryland
- Bel Air, Maryland
- Brooklyn, Maryland
- Brooklyn Park, Maryland
- Catonsville, Maryland
- Cockeysville, Maryland
- Columbia, Maryland
- Curtis Bay, Maryland
- Dundalk, Maryland
- Eldersburg, Maryland
- Elkridge, Maryland
- Ellicott City, Maryland
- Essex, Maryland
- Fullerton, Maryland
- Glen Burnie, Maryland
- Halethorpe, Maryland
- Linthicum, Maryland
- Lutherville-Timonium, Maryland
- Middle River, Maryland
- North Laurel, Maryland
- Owings Mills, Maryland
- Overlea, Maryland
- Parkville, Maryland
- Pasadena, Maryland
- Perry Hall, Maryland
- Pikesville, Maryland
- Randallstown, Maryland
- Reisterstown, Maryland
- Savage, Maryland
- Severna Park, Maryland
- Towson, Maryland
- Westminster, Maryland
- Woodlawn, Maryland

=== Washington, D.C. area ===
- Washington, D.C.
- Bethesda, Maryland
- Bowie, Maryland
- Chevy Chase, Maryland
- College Park, Maryland
- Frederick, Maryland
- Gaithersburg, Maryland
- Germantown, Maryland
- Greenbelt, Maryland
- Laurel, Maryland
- Potomac, Maryland
- Rockville, Maryland
- Silver Spring, Maryland
- Upper Marlboro, Maryland
- Alexandria, Virginia
- Annandale, Virginia
- Arlington, Virginia
- Ashburn, Virginia
- Chantilly, Virginia
- Fairfax, Virginia
- Falls Church, Virginia
- Fredericksburg, Virginia
- Great Falls, Virginia
- Herndon, Virginia
- Langley, Virginia
- Leesburg, Virginia
- Manassas, Virginia
- Manassas Park, Virginia
- Massaponax, Virginia
- McLean, Virginia
- Mt. Vernon, Virginia
- Reston, Virginia
- Springfield, Virginia
- Tysons, Virginia
- Vienna, Virginia

=== Outlying areas ===
- California, Maryland
- Cambridge, Maryland
- Centreville, Maryland
- Easton, Maryland
- Frederick, Maryland
- Hagerstown, Maryland
- Hancock, Maryland
- Lexington Park, Maryland
- Thurmont, Maryland
- Chambersburg, Pennsylvania
- McConnellsburg, Pennsylvania
- Waynesboro, Pennsylvania
- Culpeper, Virginia
- Warrenton, Virginia
- Winchester, Virginia
- Charles Town, West Virginia
- Martinsburg, West Virginia

== Economy ==
=== Primary industries ===
==== Biotechnology ====
Maryland's Washington suburbs are a major center for biotechnology. Prominent local biotechnology companies include MedImmune, United Therapeutics, The Institute for Genomic Research, Human Genome Sciences, and the Howard Hughes Medical Institute.

==== Defense contracting ====
Many defense contractors are based in Northern Virginia and Montgomery County, Maryland to be close to the Pentagon in Arlington. Local defense contractors include Lockheed Martin, the largest, as well as Northrop Grumman, General Dynamics, BAE Systems Inc., Computer Sciences Corporation (CSC), Booz Allen Hamilton, Leidos, Science Applications International Corporation (SAIC), Orbital Sciences Corporation, and AAI Corporation.

=== Notable company headquarters in the region ===
Numbers denote Fortune 500 ranking.

==== Maryland ====
Baltimore area:

- AAI Corporation (Hunt Valley)
- Advertising.com (Baltimore)
- Allegis Group (Hanover)
- Black & Decker (Towson)
- Ciena Corporation (Hanover)
- Colfax Corporation (Annapolis Junction)
- Constellation Energy (Baltimore)
- Corporate Office Properties Trust (Columbia)
- The Cordish Companies (Baltimore)
- CoverGirl (Hunt Valley)
- Fila USA (Sparks)
- Firaxis Games (Sparks)
- First Friday's Group (Baltimore)
- Legg Mason (Baltimore)
- McCormick & Company (Hunt Valley) 482
- MICROS Systems (Columbia)
- Millennial Media (Baltimore)
- Nielsen Audio (Columbia)
- Pandora Jewelry USA (Baltimore)
- T. Rowe Price (Baltimore) 447
- Transamerica Corporation (Baltimore)
- Sinclair Broadcast Group (Hunt Valley) 465
- Sourcefire (Columbia)
- Sylvan Learning (Baltimore)
- Under Armour (Baltimore)
- W.R. Grace & Co. (Columbia)
- The Whiting-Turner Contracting Company (Towson)

Washington area:

- 2U (company) (Lanham, Maryland)
- ASRC Aerospace Corporation (Greenbelt, Maryland)
- Bethesda Softworks (Rockville)
- Clark Construction (Bethesda)
- Choice Hotels (Rockville)
- Coventry Health Care (Bethesda)
- EagleBank (Bethesda)
- Enviva (Bethesda)
- Federal Realty Investment Trust (Rockville)
- GEICO (Chevy Chase)
- Host Hotels & Resorts (Bethesda) 472
- Hughes Network Systems (Germantown)
- Inovalon (Bowie, Maryland)
- JBG Smith (Chevy Chase)
- Lockheed Martin (Bethesda) 49
- Marriott International (Bethesda) 293
- MedImmune (Gaithersburg)
- New Enterprise Associates (Chevy Chase)
- Novavax (Gaithersburg)
- Radio One (Lanham)
- Ritz-Carlton (Chevy Chase)
- Travel Channel (Chevy Chase)
- TV One (Silver Spring)
- United Therapeutics (Silver Spring)

==== Northern Virginia ====
- AES Corporation (Arlington) 194
- Amazon (Crystal City)
- Appian Corporation (Tysons Corner)
- Airbus North America (Herndon)
- BAE Systems Inc. (Arlington)
- Bechtel (Reston)
- Bloomberg Industry Group (Arlington)
- Boeing (Arlington) 58
- Booz Allen Hamilton (McLean) 481
- CACI (Arlington)
- Capital One (McLean) 100
- Carfax (Centreville, Virginia)
- Computer Sciences Corporation (Falls Church) 379
- Communications Satellite Corporation (Herndon)
- Comscore (Reston)
- Cvent (Tysons Corner)
- DynCorp International (Falls Church)
- Freddie Mac (McLean) 39
- FNH USA (Fredericksburg)
- FLIR Systems Government and Defense (Arlington)
- Graham Holdings (Arlington)
- Gannett Company (McLean)
- General Dynamics (Falls Church) 90
- GTT Communications (Tysons Corner)
- Hilton Hotels Corporation (McLean) 241
- ICF International (Fairfax)
- Iridium Communications (McLean)
- Stride, Inc. (Herndon)
- Kellogg Brown and Root Services (Arlington)
- Leidos (Reston) 381
- Ligado Networks (Reston)
- Mars, Incorporated (McLean)
- M.C. Dean, Inc. (Dulles)
- MicroStrategy (Tysons Corner)
- Naviance (Arlington)
- Navy Federal Credit Union (Vienna)
- NII Holdings (Reston)
- Northrop Grumman (Falls Church) 114
- NVR Incorporated (Reston) 446
- Orbital Sciences (Dulles)
- Park Hotels & Resorts (Tysons Corner)
- Parsons Corporation (Centreville)
- Rolls-Royce North America (Reston)
- Rosetta Stone (Arlington)
- Science Applications International Corporation (McLean)
- SLM Corporation (Reston) "Sallie Mae"
- Strategic Education, Inc. (Herndon)
- Space Adventures (Vienna)
- Tegna Inc. (Tysons Corner)
- The Motley Fool (Alexandria, Virginia)
- The Teaching Company (Chantilly)
- Verisign (Reston)
- Verizon Business (Ashburn)
- Vivmark Residential (Arlington)
- Volkswagen Group of America (Herndon)
- VSE Corporation (Alexandria, Virginia)
- XO Communications (Herndon)

==== Washington, D.C. ====
- &pizza
- APCO Worldwide
- Atlantic Media
- Black Entertainment Television
- Blackboard Inc.
- Bluemercury
- Carlyle Group
- Chemonics
- Cogent Communications
- CoStar Group
- Danaher Corporation 239
- Fannie Mae 53
- FiscalNote
- Framebridge
- Gallup
- Mapbox
- Morning Consult
- National Geographic Society
- NGP VAN
- Pepco Holdings 279
- Social Tables
- The Washington Post Company
- Vox Media
- XM Satellite Radio

== Sports ==
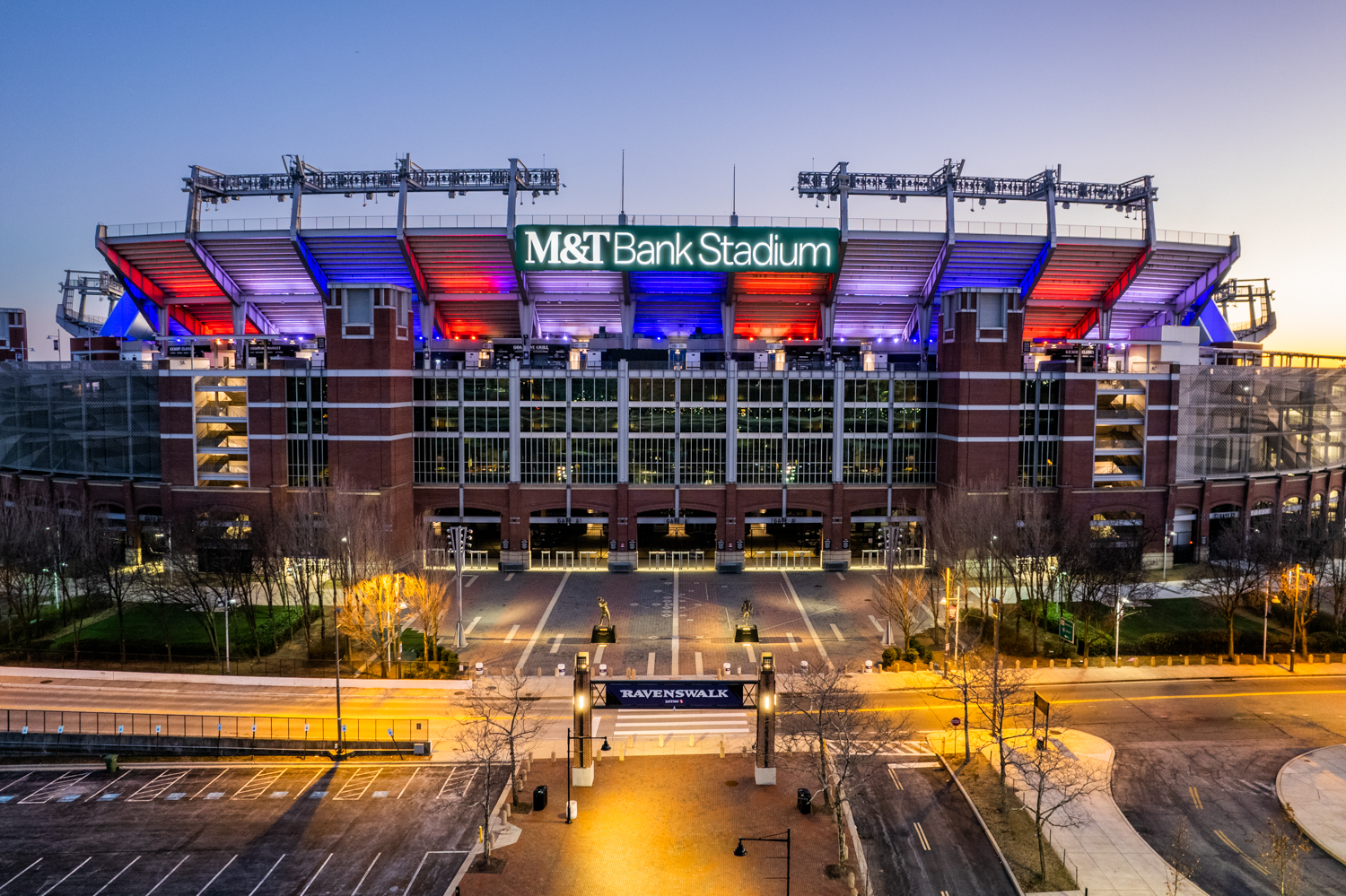
M&T Bank Stadium in Baltimore, home field of the Baltimore Ravens of the National Football League

=== Table of professional teams and venues ===
Club	Sport	League	Founded	Venue
Washington Capitals	Hockey	NHL	1974	Capital One Arena
Washington Nationals	Baseball	MLB	2005 (Note: Year team moved to current location)	Nationals Park
Baltimore Orioles	Baseball	MLB	1954	Oriole Park at Camden Yards
Washington Wizards	Basketball	NBA	1973	Capital One Arena
Baltimore Ravens	Football	NFL	1996	M&T Bank Stadium
Washington Commanders	Football	NFL	1937	Northwest Stadium
DC Defenders	Football	UFL	2018	Audi Field
D.C. United	Soccer	MLS	1996	Audi Field
Washington Freedom	Cricket	MLC	2023	Revolving
Capital City Go-Go	Basketball	NBAGL	2018	CareFirst Arena
Old Glory DC	Rugby union	MLR	2018	George Mason Stadium
Washington Mystics	Basketball	WNBA	1998	CareFirst Arena
DC Flight	Volleyball	MLV	2026	The Anthem
Washington Spirit	Soccer	NWSL	2011 (Note: Founded as D.C. United Women; rebranded as Washington Spirit in 2012 and started NWSL play in 2013.)	Audi Field
Maryland Whipsnakes	Lacrosse	PLL	2019	Homewood Field

== Transportation ==
Location of commercial airports in the Washington-Baltimore combined statistical area

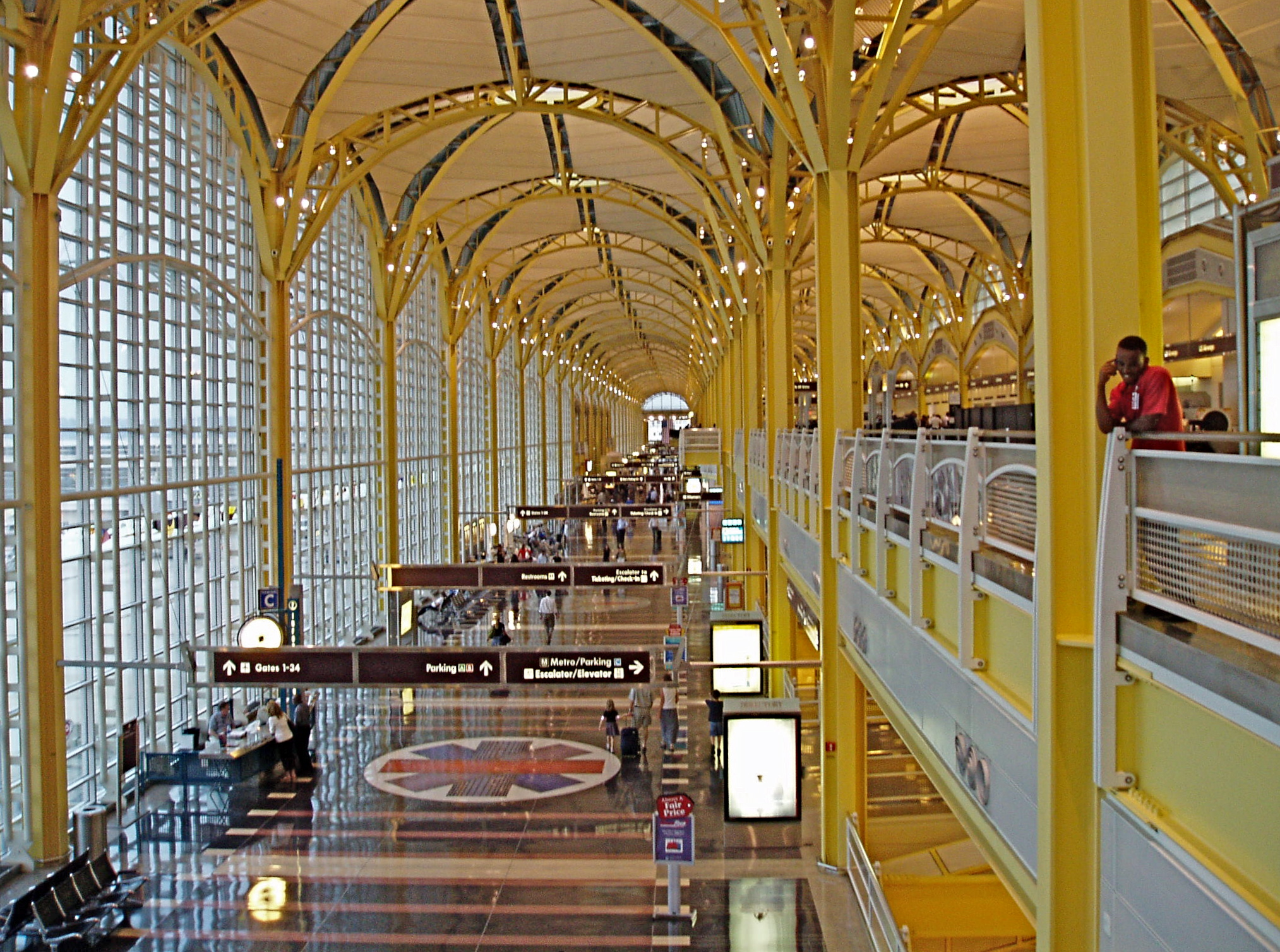
Ronald Reagan Washington National Airport in Crystal City, Virginia, the nation's 23rd-busiest airport and busiest airport in the Washington-Baltimore area

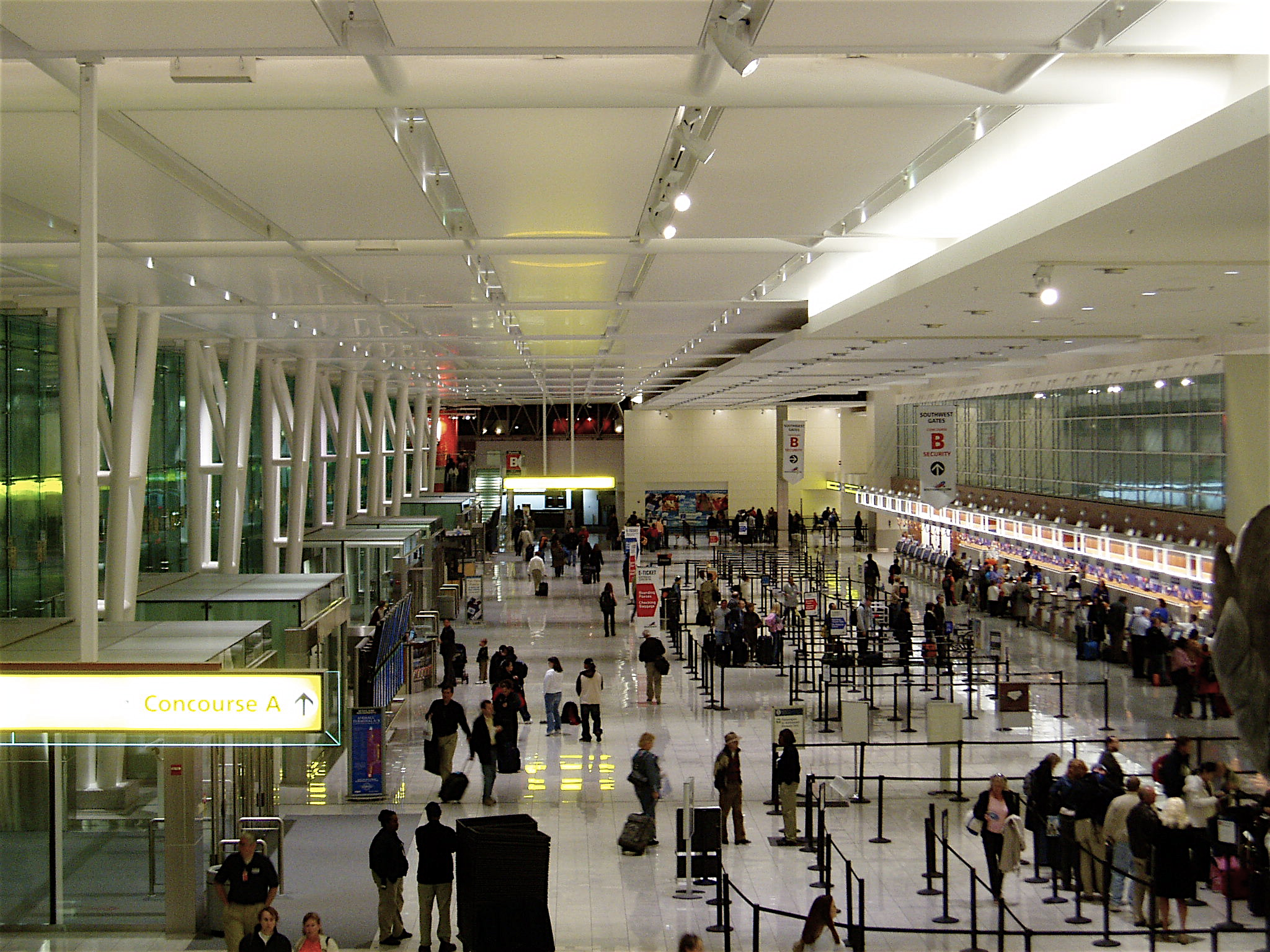
Baltimore/Washington International Airport (BWI), the nation's 25th-busiest airport and second-busiest airport in the Washington-Baltimore area

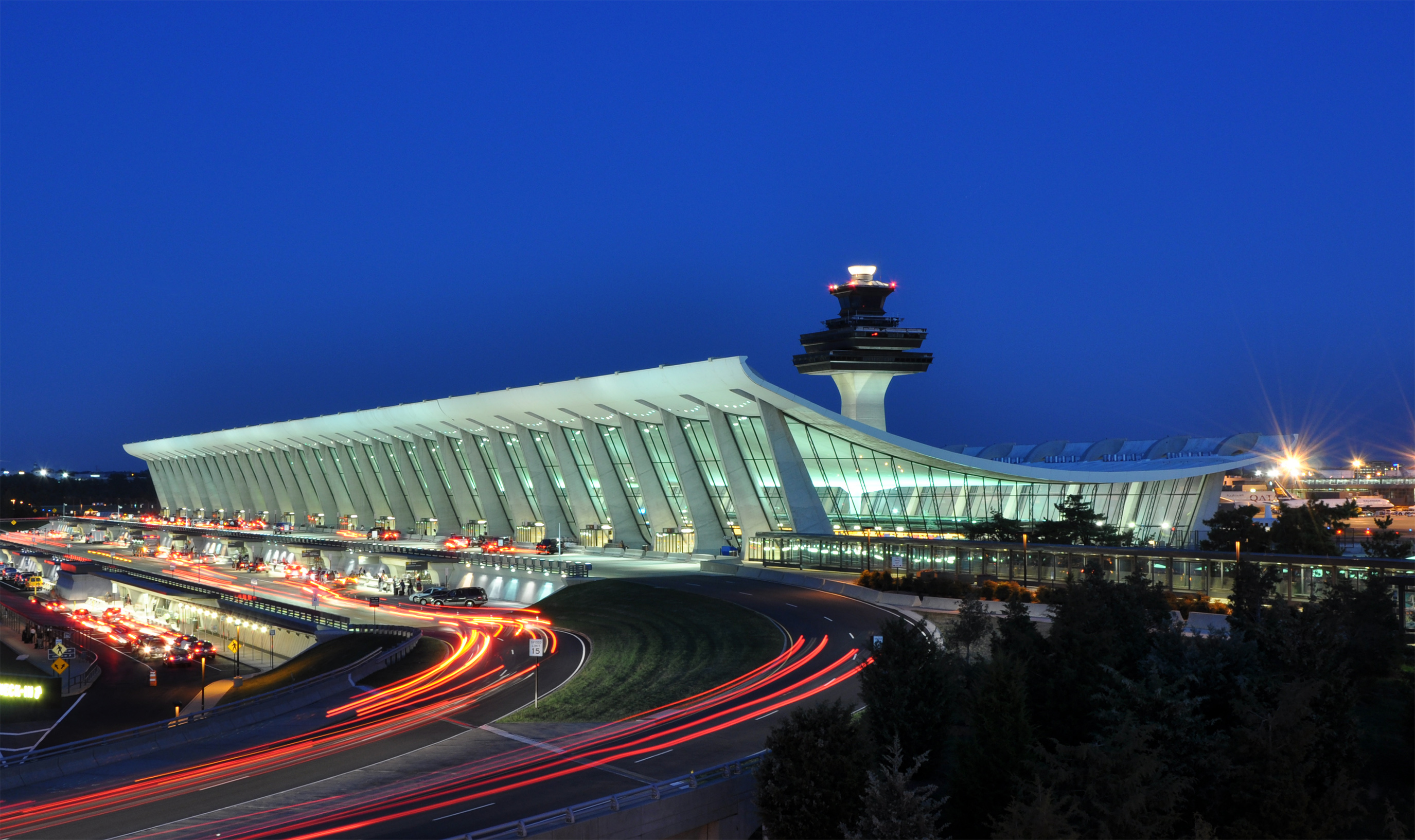
Dulles International Airport, the nation's 28th-busiest airport and third-busiest airport in the Washington-Baltimore area

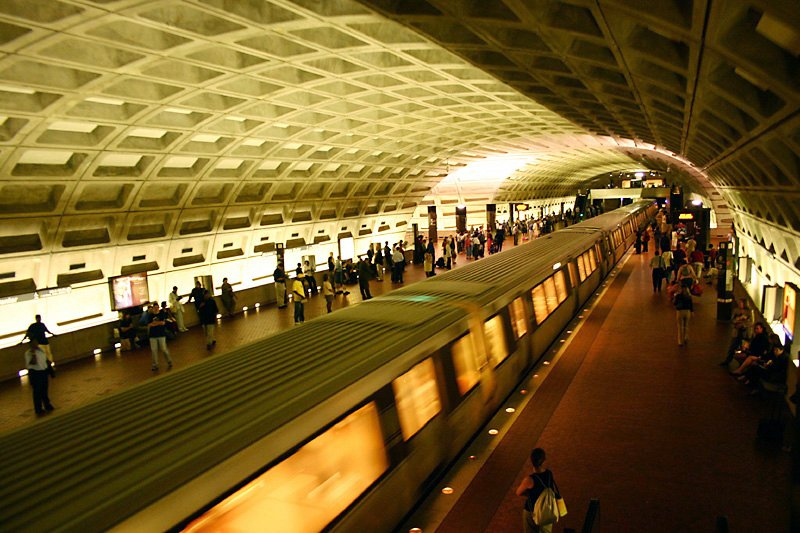
Washington Metro

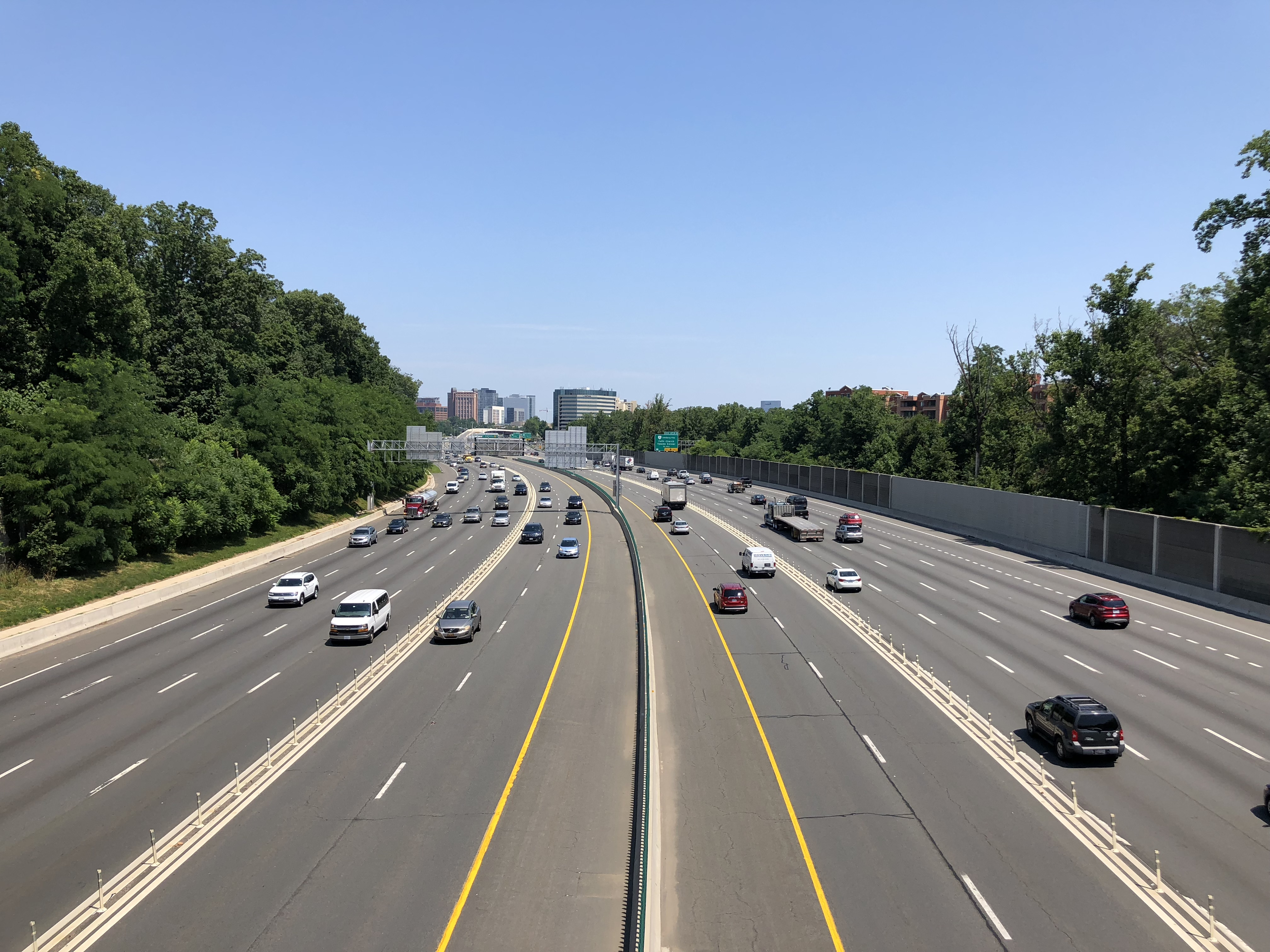
The Capital Beltway (I-495) in Northern Virginia

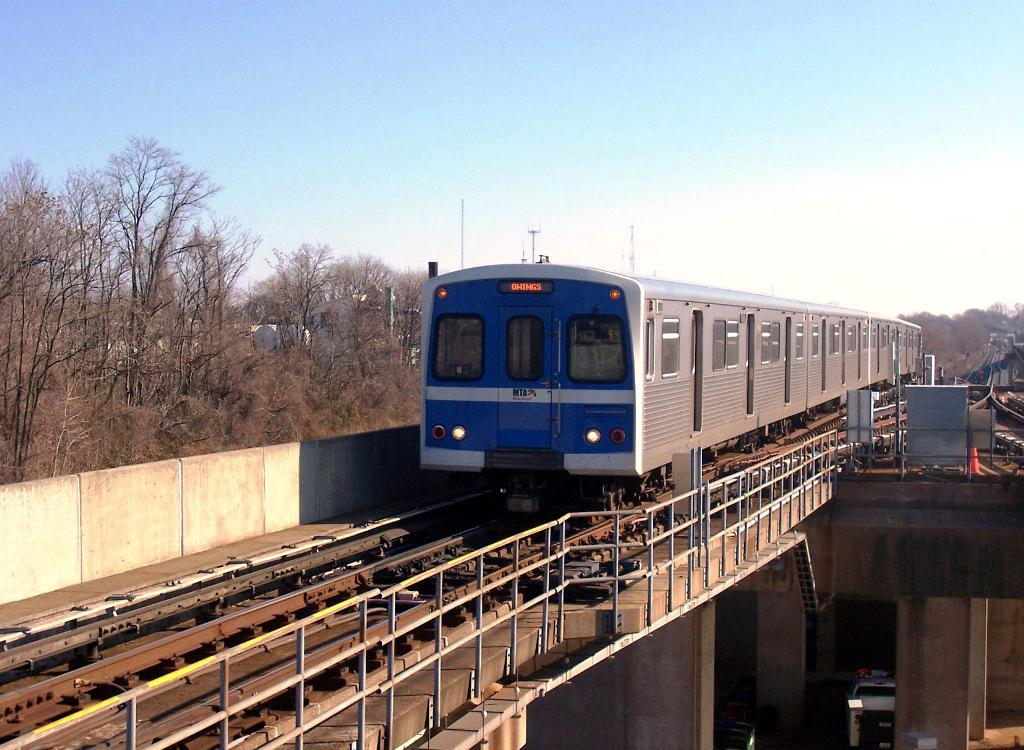
Baltimore Metro SubwayLink

=== Commercial airports ===
Airport	IATA code	ICAO code	County	State	Note
Baltimore/Washington International Airport	BWI	KBWI	Anne Arundel County	Maryland	The closest airport to Baltimore and region's busiest airport
Dulles International Airport	IAD	KIAD	Loudoun County	Virginia	Most international traffic in region
Hagerstown Regional Airport	HGR	KHGR	Washington County	Maryland	Serves Western Maryland, the Eastern Panhandle of West Virginia, and portions of south-central Pennsylvania and northwestern Virginia along the Interstate 81 corridor
Ronald Reagan Washington National Airport	DCA	KDCA	Arlington County	Virginia	Region's second-busiest airport and its closest airport to Washington, D.C.

=== Rail transit systems ===
==== Intercity Rail ====
- Amtrak

==== Commuter/Regional Rail ====
- MARC Train
- Virginia Railway Express

==== Heavy Rail Subway ====
- Washington Metro
- Baltimore Metro SubwayLink

==== Light Rail ====
- Baltimore Light RailLink
- Purple Line (under construction; projected opening 2027)

=== Major highways ===
Interstates

- Interstate 66
- Interstate 70
- Interstate 81
- Interstate 83
- Interstate 95
- Interstate 97
- Interstate 195
- Interstate 270
- Interstate 295
- Interstate 370
- Interstate 395 (District of Columbia-Virginia)
- Interstate 395 (Maryland)
- Interstate 495 (Capital Beltway)
- Interstate 595 (Unsigned)
- Interstate 695 (District of Columbia)
- Interstate 695 (Baltimore Beltway)
- Interstate 795
- Interstate 895

U.S. Routes

- U.S. Route 1
- U.S. Route 11
- U.S. Route 15
- U.S. Route 29
- U.S. Route 40
- U.S. Route 50
- U.S. Route 301
- U.S. Route 340

State Routes

- District of Columbia Route 295 (Note: Signed as a DC state route following the MD-295 interchange in Tuxedo.) (Anacostia Freeway)
- Maryland Route 2
- Maryland Route 4
- Maryland Route 5
- Maryland Route 26
- Maryland Route 32
- Maryland Route 97
- Maryland Route 100
- Maryland Route 200 (Intercounty Connector)
- Maryland Route 410 (East-West Highway)
- Baltimore–Washington Parkway (Note: 295 is maintained by the National Park Service south of MD-175, by the Baltimore Dept. of Transportation in city limits, and by the Maryland State Highway Department all other sections.) (Maryland Route 295)
- Maryland Route 355
- Virginia State Route 3
- Virginia State Route 7
- Virginia State Route 9
- Virginia State Route 28
- Virginia State Route 267
- Virginia State Route 286 (Fairfax County Parkway)
- Virginia State Route 289 (Franconia–Springfield Parkway)
- West Virginia Route 9

== See also ==
- Beltway Series
- List of parks in the Baltimore–Washington metropolitan area
- National Capital Region
- United States metropolitan area
