= Noland Arbaugh =

First human recipient of a Neuralink implant

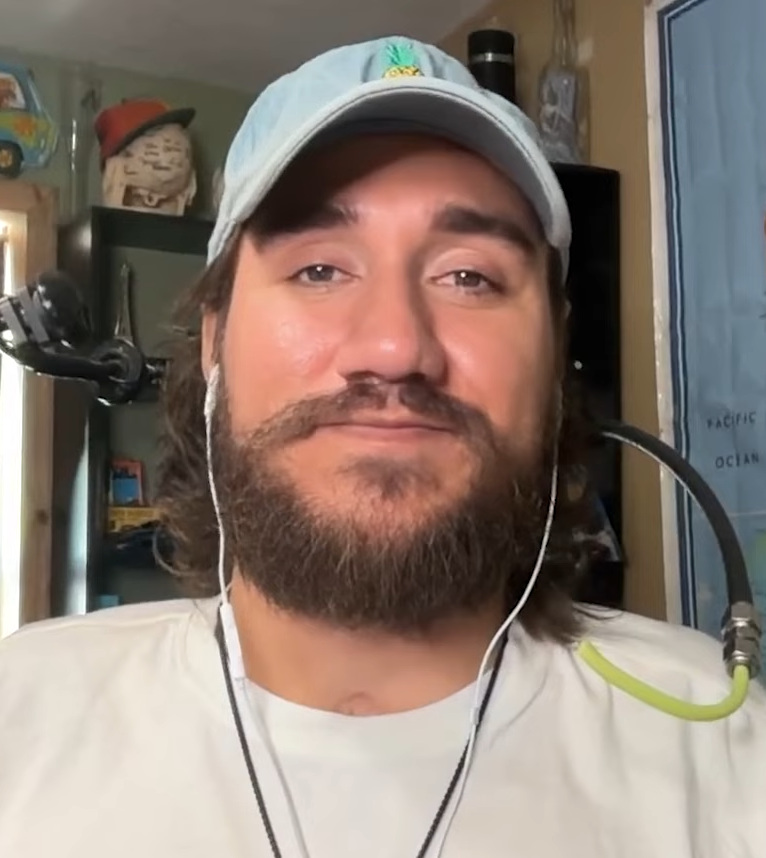
- Arbaugh in 2025
- Born: 1993 or 1994 (age 32–33)
- Known for: First human recipient of a Neuralink brain-computer interface implant

Noland Arbaugh (born 1993 or 1994) is an American man with tetraplegia who in January 2024 became the first human recipient of Neuralink's investigational brain-computer interface implant as part of the company's clinical trial.

After a spinal cord injury left him paralyzed below the shoulders, he gained public attention for using the device to regain some independence in using a computer, including controlling a computer cursor and playing online chess through the implant.

== Early life and injury ==
Arbaugh grew up in Yuma, Arizona, attended Texas A&M University, studied international studies, and joined the university's Corps of Cadets, but left a couple of credits short of graduating. In 2016, while working as a counselor at Island Lake Camp in Starrucca, Pennsylvania, Arbaugh suffered a cervical spinal cord injury in a swimming accident. Friends pulled him from the water and he was taken in for emergency surgery. The injury left him paralyzed below the shoulders. He later underwent rehabilitation at Helen Hayes Hospital in New York and Craig Hospital in Colorado before returning to Yuma to live with his family. After the accident he relied on his family and other caregivers for much of his daily care. Before receiving the implant, he used a mouth stick, voice control, and other assistive methods to operate an iPad and similar devices.

== Neuralink trial ==
In September 2023, after a friend from Texas A&M's Corps of Cadets told him that Neuralink had begun recruiting for human trials, Arbaugh applied to the study. He began screening through the Barrow Neurological Institute the following day and, in early January 2024, was told that he had been selected as the first participant.

Arbaugh underwent surgery at Barrow in Phoenix, Arizona in late January 2024. Elon Musk announced on January 29 that the first human patient had received the device and was recovering well, and Neuralink identified him as Arbaugh in March. Arbaugh said the surgery was straightforward and that he was discharged the following day without cognitive impairment.

Arbaugh received Neuralink's N1 implant, which uses 64 flexible threads carrying 1,024 electrodes to record neural activity in the motor cortex and translate intended movement into computer control. He later said he learned to use the system through both attempted and imagined movement.

On March 20, 2024, Neuralink released a livestream showing Arbaugh moving a computer cursor and playing online chess using the implant. Reuters quoted neural engineering expert Kip Ludwig as saying that the demonstration was not a "breakthrough" but "a good starting point" and that it was still "the very early days post-implantation". Arbaugh also said the device had allowed him to resume playing Civilization VI and other video games. He said the implant had restored a significant measure of independence by letting him use a computer without physical assistance.

About a month after surgery, some of the implant's threads retracted from Arbaugh's brain, reducing the number of effective electrodes and degrading performance. Neuralink had told him that only about 15% of the implanted threads remained in place. The U.S. Food and Drug Administration had earlier raised safety concerns about the threads, and Reuters, citing unnamed sources, reported that Neuralink knew from animal testing that the threads could retract. Arbaugh said that the prospect of losing the device's benefits was emotionally difficult and that he feared the implant might have to be removed. Neuralink said software modifications improved performance. In July 2024, a Neuralink executive said the threads had become "more or less very stable" and that the company planned to sculpt the skull surface and adjust carbon dioxide levels for later implants.

A 2025 systematic review estimated that about 80 people worldwide had received implantable brain-computer interfaces; earlier recipients include Matthew Nagle, who used an implanted array to move a cursor in 2004.

By August 2025, Fortune reported that Arbaugh was using the device about 10 hours a day, had enrolled in prerequisite classes at a community college in Arizona for a degree in neuroscience, and was developing a business focused on paid public speaking engagements.
