= Neuralink =

American neurotechnology company

Neuralink Corp.
- Type: Private
- Industry: Neurotechnology
- Founded: June 21, 2016; 10 years ago
- Founders: Elon Musk; Max Hodak; Benjamin Rapoport; Dongjin Seo; Paul Merolla; Philip Sabes; Timothy J. Gardner; Tim Hanson; Vanessa Tolosa
- Headquarters: Fremont, California, United States
- Key people: Elon Musk (CEO)
- Products: Telepathy; Blindsight
- Owner: Elon Musk (over 50%)
- Number of employees: c. 300 (2022)
- Website: neuralink.com

Neuralink Corp. is an American neurotechnology company that is developing implantable brain–computer interfaces (BCIs). It was founded by Elon Musk and a team of eight scientists and engineers. Neuralink was launched in 2016 and first publicly reported in March 2017. The company is based in Fremont, California, with plans to build a three-story building with office and manufacturing space in Del Valle, about 10 miles east of Gigafactory Texas, Tesla's headquarters and manufacturing plant.

Since its founding, the company has hired several high-profile neuroscientists from various universities. By 2019, it had received $158 million in funding ($100 million was from Musk) and had 90 employees. At that time, Neuralink announced that it was working on a "sewing machine-like" device capable of implanting very thin (4 to 6 μm in width) threads into the brain, and demonstrated a system that reads information from a lab rat via 1,500 electrodes. It anticipated starting experiments with humans in 2020, but later moved that to 2023. As of May 2023, it has been approved for human trials in the United States. On January 29, 2024, Musk announced that Neuralink had successfully implanted a Neuralink device in a human and that the patient was recovering. He was later identified as Noland Arbaugh.

The company has faced criticism for the large number of primates that were euthanized after medical trials. The monkeys' veterinary records allegedly show complications with surgically implanted electrodes. In September 2024, Neuralink announced that its latest development effort, Blindsight, would enable blind people whose visual cortex is undamaged to regain some level of vision. The development received "breakthrough" status from the U.S. federal government, which will accelerate development. In August and September 2025, Toronto's University Health Network performed Canada's first Neuralink brain implant surgeries on two patients with cervical spinal cord injuries, marking the first such procedures outside the United States.

== Company ==
=== History ===
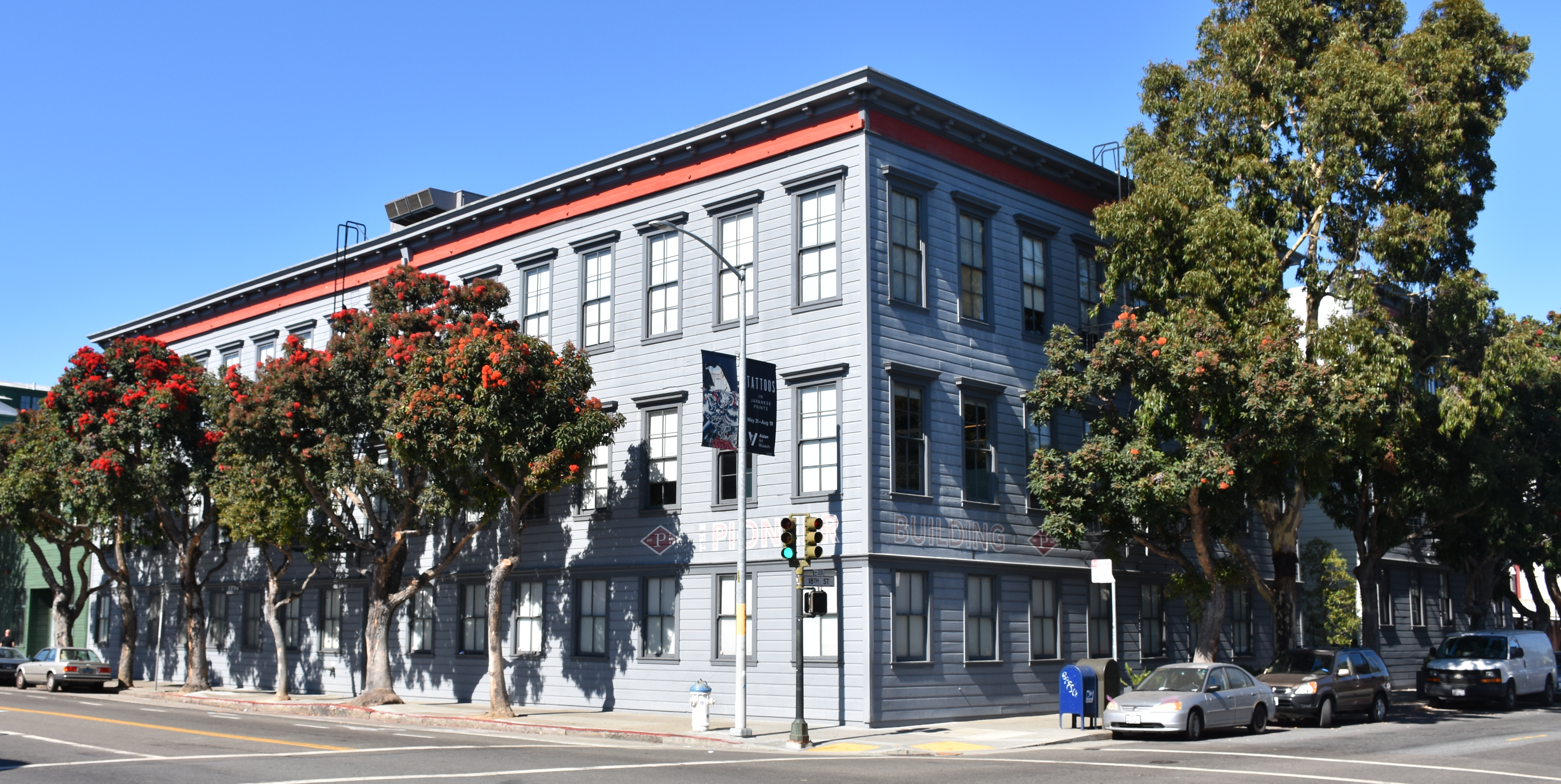
The Pioneer Building in San Francisco, formerly housing the offices of Neuralink and OpenAI

Neuralink was founded in 2016 by Elon Musk and a founding team of eight scientists and engineers: Max Hodak, Benjamin Rapoport, Dongjin Seo, Paul Merolla, Philip Sabes, Tim Gardner, Tim Hanson, and Vanessa Tolosa. The initial hires included experts in neuroscience, biochemistry, and robotics. In January 2017, Musk proxies approached Pedram Mohseni and Randolph Nudo, who owned the rights to the name "NeuraLink".

In April 2017, Neuralink announced that it was aiming in the short term to make devices to treat serious brain diseases, with the eventual goal of human enhancement, sometimes called transhumanism. Musk said his interest in the idea partly stemmed from the concept of "neural lace" in the fictional universe in The Culture, a series of 10 novels by Iain M. Banks.

Musk defined the neural lace as a "digital layer above the cortex" that would not necessarily require extensive surgical insertion but could be implanted through a vein or artery. He said the long-term goal is to achieve "symbiosis with artificial intelligence", which he perceives as an existential threat to humanity if unchecked. He believes the device will be "something analogous to a video game, like a saved game situation, where you are able to resume and upload your last state" and "address brain injuries or spinal injuries and make up for whatever lost capacity somebody has with a chip."

Jared Birchall, the head of Musk's family office, was listed as Neuralink's CEO, CFO, and president in 2018. As of September 2018, Musk was its majority owner but did not hold an executive position. Tesla's October 2026 proxy statement lists Musk as Neuralink's chief executive officer. Co-founder Benjamin Rapoport cited safety concerns as a major influence on his decision to leave Neuralink in 2018. Rapoport subsequently founded Precision Neuroscience, emphasizing the use of surface electrodes as opposed to the penetrating electrodes of Neuralink, in order to address brain damage and other safety concerns caused by Neuralink's devices.

By August 2020, only three of the eight founding scientists remained at the company, according to an article by Stat News. It reported that Neuralink had seen "years of internal conflict in which rushed timelines have clashed with the slow and incremental pace of science". As of 2020, Neuralink was headquartered in San Francisco's Mission District, sharing the Pioneer building with OpenAI, another company Musk co-founded. As of 2022, Neuralink's headquarters were in Fremont, California.

In April 2021, Neuralink demonstrated a monkey playing the game "Pong" using a Neuralink implant. Similar technology had existed since 2002, when a research group demonstrated a monkey moving a computer cursor with neural signals, but scientists acknowledged that making the implant wireless and increasing the number of implanted electrodes represented engineering progress.

In May 2021, co-founder and president Max Hodak announced that he no longer worked with the company. Only two of the eight co-founders remained at the company as of January 2022. On February 8, 2024, Musk changed the location of Neuralink's business incorporation from Delaware to Nevada after Delaware Court of Chancery Chancellor Kathaleen McCormick voided Musk's $55 billion pay package at Tesla, a remedy the Delaware Supreme Court reversed in December 2025. In April 2025, Neuralink labeled itself a "small disadvantaged business" in a federal filing that would have reached the U.S. Small Business Administration. A company spokesperson told CNBC that the box on SAM.gov "was erroneously checked and has since been updated". In June 2025, Neuralink raised $650 million in a Series E round, reportedly at a pre-money valuation of about $9 billion. At the end of 2025, Musk said Neuralink would begin "high-volume production" of its devices and move to an almost entirely automated surgical procedure in 2026.

== Technology ==
In 2018, Gizmodo reported that Neuralink "remained highly secretive about its work". Public records showed that it had sought to open an animal testing facility in San Francisco, but it subsequently began doing research at the University of California, Davis. In 2019, during a live presentation at the California Academy of Sciences, the Neuralink team revealed the technology of the first prototype it had been working on. It is a system that involves ultra-thin probes inserted into the brain, a neurosurgical robot to perform the operations, and a high-density electronic system capable of processing information from neurons.

=== Probes ===
The probes, made mostly of polyimide, a biocompatible material, with a thin gold or platinum conductor, are inserted into the brain through an automated process performed by a surgical robot. Each probe consists of an area of wires that contains electrodes capable of locating electrical signals in the brain and a sensory area where the wire interacts with an electronic system that allows amplification and acquisition of the brain signal. Each probe contains 48 or 96 wires, each of which contains 32 independent electrodes, making a system of up to 3,072 electrodes per formation.

=== Robot ===
Neuralink says it has engineered a surgical robot capable of rapidly inserting many flexible probes into the brain, which may avoid the tissue damage and longevity problems associated with larger, more rigid probes. This surgical robot has an insertion head with a 25 μm diameter needle made of tungsten-rhenium designed to attach to the insertion loops, inject individual probes, and penetrate the meninges and cerebral tissue; it can insert up to six threads (192 electrodes) per minute. A linear motor powers the needle, enabling fast retraction acceleration and varying insertion speeds. A 50-μm tungsten wire that has been bent at the tip and is driven both axially and rotationally makes up the pincher. An imaging stack is also included in the inserter head for needle guidance, real-time insertion viewing, and verification.

=== Electronics ===
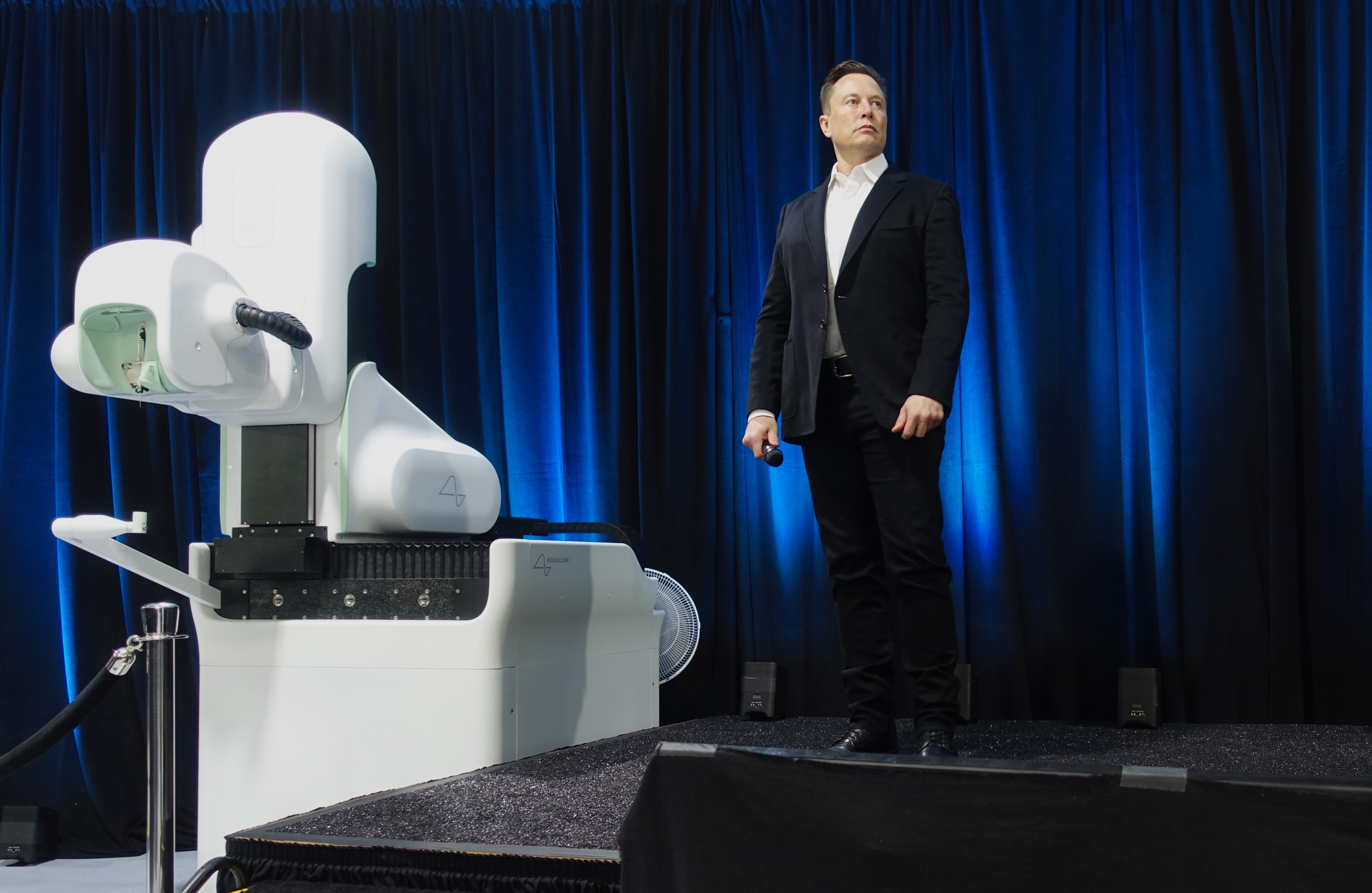
Elon Musk discussing the Neuralink

Neuralink has developed an application-specific integrated circuit to create a 1,536-channel recording system. This system consists of 256 amplifiers that can be individually programmed, analog-to-digital converters within the chip, and peripheral circuit control to serialize the digitized information obtained. It aims to convert information obtained from neurons into an understandable binary code in order to achieve greater understanding of brain function and the ability to stimulate these neurons back. So far, Neuralink's electrodes are too big to record the firing of individual neurons; they can record only the firing of a group of neurons. Neuralink representatives believe this issue may be mitigated algorithmically, but it is computationally expensive and does not produce exact results. In July 2020, Musk said that Neuralink had obtained a FDA breakthrough device designation, which allows limited human testing under the FDA guidelines for medical devices.

=== Public compression challenge ===
In May 2024, Neuralink launched a public challenge to compress its implant's neural recordings, saying that a compression ratio of more than 200x was needed to transmit the data wirelessly. The challenge specified that compression needed to be lossless, work under low power, and compress data in real time. Software consultant Roy van Rijn called the prospect of 200x lossless compression "just outlandish."

== Animal testing and harm ==
Neuralink tests its devices by surgically implanting them in the brains of live animals, including monkeys, pigs, and sheep. This has been criticized by groups such as PETA. In August 2020, Neuralink conducted a live demo in which the brain activity of a pig, Gertrude, was displayed in real time. The device, which Musk said is removable, is coin-sized (roughly 23 millimeters in diameter) and was implanted in Gertrude's brain, where it recorded signals from neurons connected to her snout as she sniffed and touched things. Musk said the device could eventually help treat neurological conditions and allow humans to merge with artificial intelligence. The demonstration included two other pigs: Joyce, which had no implant, and Dorothy, which Musk said had previously had a chip implanted and then removed, to show that the device could be taken out and the pig would remain "healthy, happy and indistinguishable from a normal pig".

From 2017 to 2020, Neuralink's experiments on monkeys were conducted in partnership with University of California, Davis. According to the PCRM, UC Davis transferred seven monkeys to Neuralink at the end of the partnership. In February 2022, the Physicians Committee for Responsible Medicine (PCRM), an animal welfare advocacy group, filed a complaint with the USDA alleging that Neuralink and UC Davis had mistreated several monkeys, subjecting them to psychological distress, extreme suffering, and chronic infections due to surgeries. Experiments conducted by Neuralink and UC Davis have involved at least 23 monkeys, and the PCRM believes that 15 of those died or were euthanized as a result of the experiments. The PCRM also alleged that UC Davis withheld photographic and video evidence of the mistreatment.

In February 2022, Neuralink said that two macaque monkeys had been euthanized at planned end dates and six on the medical advice of UC Davis veterinary staff, and denied allegations of animal cruelty. In December 2022, it was reported that Neuralink was under federal investigation by the United States Department of Agriculture (USDA) over potential animal welfare violations. Additionally, a Reuters report cited several Neuralink employees' claims that testing was rushed due to Musk's demands for fast results, which were causing needless animal suffering and deaths. A September 2023 exposé by Wired provided details on the primate deaths based on public records and confidential interviews with a former Neuralink employee and a researcher at the California National Primate Research Center. Those records showed complications with the installation of electrodes, including partial paralysis, bloody diarrhea, and brain swelling.

After the FDA initially rejected its application to begin human trials in 2022, Neuralink conducted additional animal testing to address safety concerns. According to Reuters, a subset of pigs implanted with the device developed granulomas, an inflammatory tissue response, in their brains. Neuralink could not determine the cause, but concluded that the device and its threads were not to blame, according to one of Reuters's sources. In July 2023, the United States Department of Agriculture told lawmakers that a "focused" inspection of Neuralink's two facilities in January 2023 had found no violations of animal research rules beyond a 2019 incident that Neuralink had self-reported. The PCRM disputed the investigation's result. In October 2023, citing internal emails and anonymous sources, Wired reported that Neuralink had tight control over what UC Davis was allowed to disclose about the experiments and that UC Davis had not released hundreds of photographs of the monkeys. In November 2023, four U.S. House Democrats asked the Securities and Exchange Commission to investigate whether Musk committed securities fraud by making false statements about monkey deaths at Neuralink. In February 2024, Reuters reported that FDA inspections in June 2023 had found record-keeping and quality-control problems at Neuralink's California animal research facility, while a similar inspection of its Texas facility found no problems.

In March 2024, Musk said on X that Neuralink's second product, Blindsight, was already working in monkeys. He said its resolution would be low at first but might ultimately exceed normal human vision, and that no monkey had died or been seriously injured by a Neuralink device. A September 2023 Wired investigation based on UC Davis veterinary records had described up to a dozen Neuralink monkeys that were euthanized after complications. The New York Times reported in February 2025 that the Department of Agriculture's inspector general had been investigating Neuralink since 2022 over the alleged mistreatment of dozens of test monkeys, and that in December 2024 Musk had posted on X a letter from his lawyer, addressed to SEC chairman Gary Gensler, stating that the SEC had reopened a separate investigation into Neuralink. In January 2025, during the first week of his second term, President Donald Trump fired at least 17 inspectors general, including USDA inspector general Phyllis Fong, whose office had opened the Neuralink investigation.

According to PCRM's Ryan Merkley, both investigations arose after PCRM discovered through a public records lawsuit that Neuralink had allegedly mistreated test monkeys. In a December 2024 news release, PCRM wrote, "Documents from the University of California, Davis, where Neuralink conducted monkey experiments from 2017 to 2020, reveal that implantation of the company's device caused debilitating health effects in monkeys, resulting in euthanasia. Animals experienced chronic infections, paralysis, swelling in the brain, loss of coordination and balance, and depression." Musk has denied the allegations of abuse.

== Human testing ==
The FDA rejected Neuralink's 2022 application to pursue human clinical trials, citing "major safety concerns involving the device's lithium battery; the potential for the implant's tiny wires to migrate to other areas of the brain; and questions over whether and how the device can be removed without damaging brain tissue", but then approved it in May 2023. In September 2023, Neuralink said it had received approval from an independent review board to begin recruiting participants for its first human trial, which the FDA had cleared in May under an investigational device exemption. The trials recruited people with tetraplegia due to cervical spinal cord injury or amyotrophic lateral sclerosis (ALS). The procedure was performed at Barrow Neurological Institute in Phoenix, Arizona.

On January 29, 2024, Musk said that Neuralink had implanted Telepathy, a brain–computer interface (BCI) device, in a human on the previous day and that the patient was recovering from the surgery. As it was a "first in human" and "early feasibility" trial to develop a concept, the company was not obligated to disclose details about the procedure or to prove safety or efficacy. Neuralink provided a few details in February on the implant in a recruitment brochure for the Precise Robotically Implanted Brain-Computer Interface (PRIME) study. On February 20, Musk said that Neuralink's first human trial participant had been able to control a computer mouse by thought.

On March 20, 2024, through a livestream on X, Neuralink introduced the person who had received the first Neuralink implant in the clinical trial, 29-year-old Noland Arbaugh. Arbaugh had become a tetraplegic after a diving accident dislocated his C4 and C5 spinal vertebrae. Noland demonstrated his ability to move a cursor on a computer screen to allow him to control music and play games such as chess. He expressed support for the implant in improving his quality of life. He acknowledged that the device was not perfect but said he was excited about the future. In a subsequent interview, Arbaugh said that 85% of the device's implant threads had completely detached, as his brain had shifted approximately three times as much as Neuralink had expected. In an August 23, 2025, Fortune article, Arbaugh was quoted as saying that he had regained much of the autonomy he lost from his disability and was able to do more things independently.

The Wall Street Journal reported that Neuralink would proceed with a second trial participant. The FDA had signed off on the company's proposed fixes for a problem that occurred with Arbaugh. In August 2024, a chip was reportedly successfully implanted in the second participant, pseudonym "Alex". Alex was reportedly able to create 3D designs by using the CAD software Autodesk Fusion and a custom mount for his Neuralink charger because of the implant. Additional accounts show that he has been able to play first-person shooter games at a higher level than before. Unlike Arbaugh's implantation procedure, Alex's procedure reduced brain motion and placed the implant closer to the brain's surface in an attempt to mitigate thread retraction. Since the initial operation, Alex has reportedly not experienced any thread retraction. In November 2024, Neuralink received approval from Health Canada for its first clinical trial in that country, to be led by Andres M. Lozano.

As of September 2025, Musk had reported 12 trial participants with over 2,000 cumulative days and 15,000 hours of usage, up from the seven Barrow mentioned in June. In January 2026, Neuralink said it had 21 participants enrolled in trials worldwide. On 28 October 2025, University College London announced that Paul, the first UK patient to have a Neuralink implant inserted, had successfully controlled a computer by thought only hours after the implant procedure took place at UCL's hospital.

== Reception ==
=== Expert opinions ===
Neuroscientists have given mixed assessments. Some have praised Neuralink's engineering achievements, including its high channel count (1,024 electrodes across 64 threads in its current implant) and fully wireless design. The U.S. Food and Drug Administration granted "breakthrough device" designation to Neuralink's Blindsight project in September 2024.

=== Criticisms and controversies ===
Neuralink has faced substantial criticism over its animal testing practices. Between 2018 and 2022, at least 1,500 animals—including monkeys, pigs, and sheep—were killed in experiments, with reports of complications leading to euthanasia in some cases. The Physicians Committee for Responsible Medicine filed complaints with the U.S. Department of Agriculture, prompting an investigation. The U.S.D.A. closed the investigation finding that Neuralink was not in violation of the Animal Welfare Act based on the specific allegations probed.

In human trials, the first patient's implant experienced partial thread retraction in 2024, reducing the number of functional electrodes, though software updates restored much of the lost performance.

== See also ==
- Brain–computer interface
- Brain implant
- Brain in a vat
- Cortical implant
- Electrocorticography
- Experience machine
- Extended reality
  - Virtual reality
  - Mixed reality
  - Augmented reality
- Kernel (neurotechnology company)
- Mind uploading
- Motor function
- Neurorobotics
- Paradromics
- Precision Neuroscience
- Spatial computing
- Surface chemistry of neural implants
- Stentrode
- The Entire History of You
- White Christmas (Black Mirror)
- Wirehead (science fiction)
- Transhumanism
