= Randolph Nudo =

American neuroscientist

- Known for: Neuroplasticity, Brain Injury Recovery
- Awards: Javits Investigator Award
- Scientific career
- Fields: Neuroscience, Rehabilitation Medicine, Neuroplasticity
- Workplaces: University of Kansas Medical Center

Randolph J. Nudo is an American neuroscientist and academic known for his contributions to rehabilitation medicine and neuroplasticity. He currently holds the position of University Distinguished Professor and Vice Chair of Research in the Department of Physical Medicine and Rehabilitation at the University of Kansas Medical Center.

== Education ==
Nudo completed his Bachelor of Science in Psychology and Statistics at Pennsylvania State University and continued his studies at Florida State University, where he received a Masters degree in psychology and a doctorate in Psychology and Neuroscience. He then undertook a Postdoctoral Fellowship in Physiology at the University of California, San Francisco.

== Career ==
Nudo joined the faculty of the University of Kansas Medical Center in 1997. He subsequently served in several research and administrative roles, including director of the Landon Center on Aging and director of the Institute for Neurological Discoveries. He held the Marion Merrell Dow Distinguished Professorship in Aging and served as vice chair for research in the Department of Rehabilitation Medicine. In 2017, he was named a University Distinguished Professor at the University of Kansas.

Nudo and his partner, Pedram Mohseni, had co-owned the trademark and the company NeuraLink since 2015. The trademark was acquired by Elon Musk in 2017 and rebranded to Neuralink.

=== Research ===
Nudo's research has focused on the neurophysiological mechanisms underlying cortical plasticity, motor learning, and recovery of function after brain injury. Studies using intracortical microstimulation mapping in nonhuman primates demonstrated that representations of skilled movements in adult motor cortex can be modified by motor training, providing evidence for experience-dependent reorganization of adult motor cortex.

Nudo and colleagues subsequently examined cortical reorganization following focal ischemic injury. In a 1996 study published in Science, rehabilitative training of skilled hand movements after a focal motor-cortex infarct prevented loss of the hand representation in adjacent undamaged cortex and, in some animals, resulted in expansion of the hand representation into regions previously associated with movements of the elbow and shoulder. The cortical reorganization was accompanied by recovery of skilled hand function. The study led to the development of experience-dependent models of post-stroke neuroplasticity and rehabilitation, and demonstrated that rehabilitative experience can shape functional reorganization of peri-infarct motor cortex.

Later work extended these principles to neural interfaces and neuroprosthetic approaches to recovery after brain injury. In a 2013 study, Nudo and colleagues used an activity-dependent neural prosthesis that detected neural activity at one cortical site and triggered stimulation at another. In a nonhuman primate model of cortical injury, the intervention improved performance of a skilled reaching task.

== Awards and honors ==
He has received a number of awards, including the Javits Investigator Award from the National Institute of Neurological Disorders and Stroke for his work on neuroscience.

== Selected publications ==
- "Stimulation-evoked effective connectivity (SEEC): An in-vivo approach for defining mesoscale corticocortical connectivity" (2023)
- "Methods and associated neural prosthetic devices for bridging brain areas to improve function" (2017)
- "Restoration of function after brain damage using a neural prosthesis" (2013)
- "Brain repair after stroke" (2010)
- "Cortical brain stimulation: a potential therapeutic agent for upper limb motor recovery following stroke" (2007)
- "Dissociation of sensorimotor deficits after rostral versus caudal lesions in the primary motor cortex hand representation" (2005)
- "Extensive cortical rewiring after brain injury" (2005)
- "Motor learning-dependent synaptogenesis is localized to functionally reorganized motor cortex" (2002)
- "Role of sensory deficits in motor impairments after injury to primary motor cortex" (2000)
- "Effects of repetitive motor training on movement representations in adult squirrel monkeys: role of use versus learning" (2000)
- "Functional reorganization of the rat motor cortex following motor skill learning" (1998)
- "Reorganization of movement representations in primary motor cortex following focal ischemic infarcts in adult squirrel monkeys" (1996)
- "Use-dependent alterations of movement representations in primary motor cortex of adult squirrel monkeys" (1996)
- "Neural substrates for the effects of rehabilitative training on motor recovery after ischemic infarct" (1996)
- "Descending pathways to the spinal cord: a comparative study of 22 mammals" (1988)
