= Andres M. Lozano =

Spanish-Canadian neurosurgeon

OC FRSC Andres M. Lozano
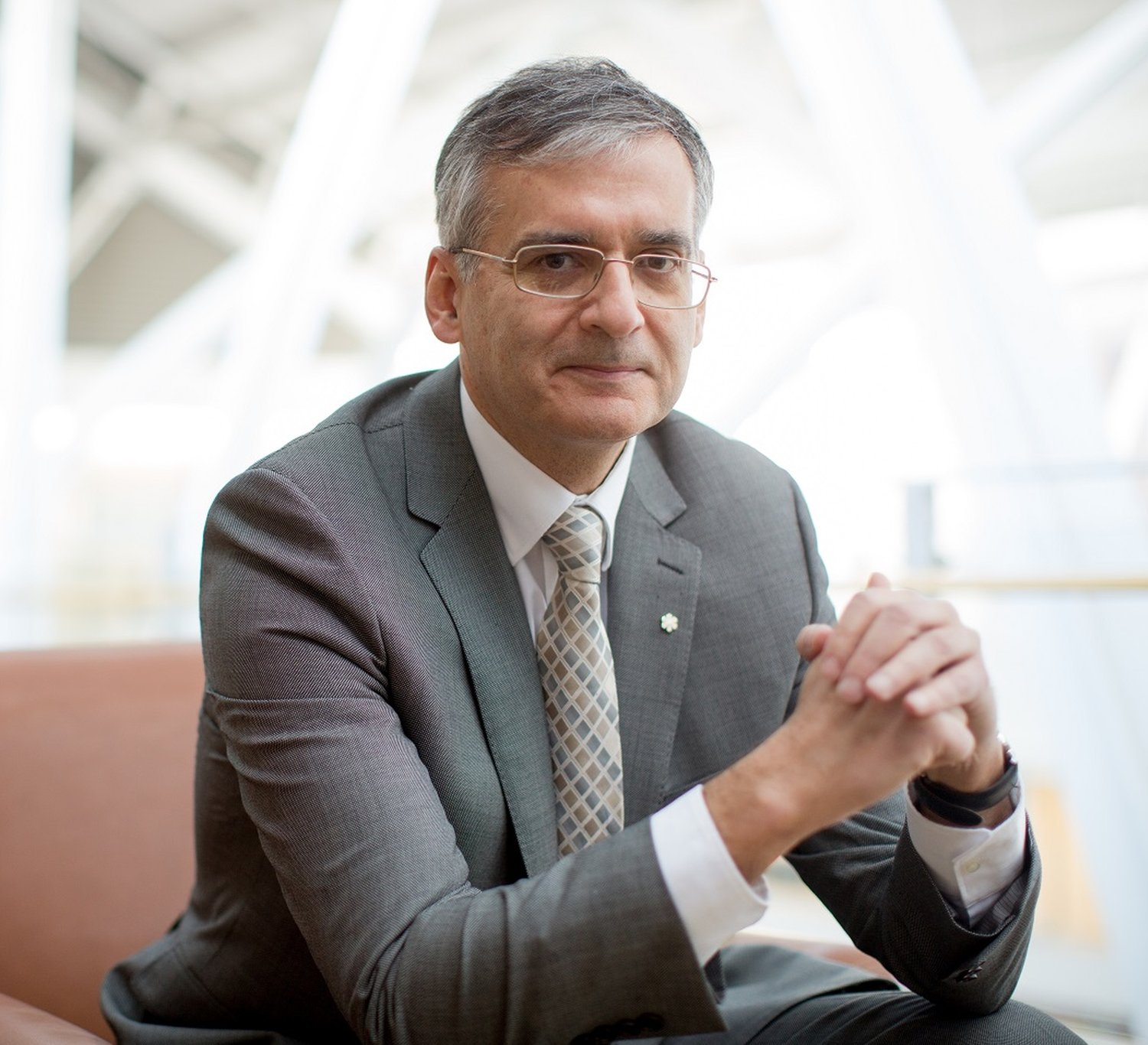
- Born: Sevilla, Spain
- Citizenship: Canadian
- Education: University of Ottawa (BSc); University of Ottawa (BMedSc); University of Ottawa (MD); McGill University (PhD)
- Known for: First application of Deep Brain Stimulation for treating Alzheimer's disease, Depression, Anorexia nervosa
- Awards: Order of Canada (2016); Canadian Academy of Health Sciences (2012); Royal Society of Canada (2009); Order of Spain (2007)
- Scientific career
- Fields: Neurosurgery, deep brain stimulation, focused ultrasound
- Workplaces: Toronto Western Hospital; University Health Network
- Thesis: The expression of the growth associated protein GAP-43 in injured and regenerating retinal ganglion cells of the adult rat / (1988)
- Doctoral advisor: Albert Aguayo

Andres M. Lozano OC FRSC is a Spanish-Canadian neurosurgeon and scientist known for his work in deep brain stimulation and MR-guided focused ultrasound surgery. He holds the Alan & Susan Hudson Cornerstone Chair in Neurosurgery at the University Health Network Toronto and is a university professor at the University of Toronto. His work has been covered by major international news publications, including BBC, Scientific American, The Independent, The Globe and Mail and NPR. He is also leading the exclusive Canadian site (CAN-PRIME) for the Neuralink trial.

== Early life and education ==
Andres Lozano was born in Sevilla, Spain, and moved to Canada at a young age. He completed his BSc in cell biology and his M.D. at the University of Ottawa in 1983. He then pursued a Ph.D. in neurobiology at McGill University, graduating in 1989. Lozano completed his neurosurgical training, earning his FRCS(C) in 1990, and became a diplomate of the American Board of Neurological Surgery in 1994.

== Career ==
Lozano's career has been centered at the University of Toronto, where he has held several positions, including the Dan Family Chairman of Neurosurgery (2010–2020) and the RR Tasker Chair in Functional Neurosurgery (1999–2021). He has also been a Canadian Research Chair in Neuroscience and an active staff member at the University Health Network since 1991.

== Research and contributions ==
Lozano has contributed extensively to the development and application of Deep Brain Stimulation and Focused Ultrasound Surgery for various neurological disorders, including Parkinson's disease, dystonia, depression, and Alzheimer's disease. His research has resulted in over 830 publications with an h-index above 145, ranking him among the most highly cited neurosurgeons globally according to Clarivate.

His team's work has included the mapping of cortical and subcortical circuits and the development of novel therapies. Lozano has led several "first in man" trials, including DBS applications for conditions like Huntington's disease and anorexia. Together with Helen Mayberg, in 2005, he published on the first human DBS for depression trial in the modern-era of DBS, targeting Brodman area 25, which has led to multiple completed and ongoing clinical trials for DBS for depression, globally. In 2010, he led the first pilot trial for human DBS in Alzheimer's disease trial targeting the Fornix region, which has led to multiple clinical trials, as well

== Honors and awards ==
- Named Canada Research Chair in Neurosciences 2005 and 2011
- Elected to the Order of Spain 2007
- Elected Fellow of the Royal Society of Canada 2009
- [Donald Calne] International Award for Parkinson's disease Research 2010
- Winn Prize Award (The Society of Neurological Surgeons), 2010
- Pioneer in Medicine Award, Society for Brain Mapping and Therapeutics, 2012
- Elected Fellow of the Canadian Academy of Health Sciences, 2012
- Olivecrona Medal, Karolinska Institute, 2012
- Margolese National Brain Prize, University of British Columbia, 2013
- Innovations Award, Canadian College of Neuropsychopharmacology, 2014
- Elected Fellow of the European Academy of Sciences 2016
- Elected Officer of the Order of Canada 2016
- TD Bank's "10 Most Influential Hispanic Canadians" Award 2016
- Doctor Honoris causa, University of Sevilla, Spain 2018
- Lifetime Achievement Award, Faculty of Medicine, University of Ottawa, 2018
- Named Honorary Member of the Colombian Society for Neurosurgery, 2019
- Dandy Medal, Walter E. Dandy Society, 2021
- SANS International Gold Medal, Saudi Association for Neurological Surgery, 2022
- Honorary Member, Spanish Society for Neuromodulation, 2022
- Norman Rosenblum Award for Excellence in Mentorship in the MD/PhD Program, University of Toronto, 2023
- Fellow, International Association of Parkinsonism and Related Disorders, 2023
- Named #2 in Canada on the Ranking of Best Neuroscientists in Canada (Research.com), 2023, 2024
- Inaugural Alim-Louis Benabid Award, Deep Brain Stimulation Society, 2024
- Elected Fellow of the Congress of Neurological Surgeons, 2024

He has also been named one of Thomson Reuters' Highly Cited Researchers program and Most Influential Scientific Minds annually from 2015 to 2022.

== Editorial and professional roles ==
Lozano serves as the editor-in-chief of Stereotactic and Functional Neurosurgery. He has been a founding member of several research organizations, including the Michael J. Fox Foundation and the Weston Foundation.

== Selected publications ==
Some of Lozano's publications in recent years include:

- "Deep Brain Stimulation: Current Challenges and Future Directions" (Nat Rev Neurol, 2019)
- "Cellular and Molecular Mechanisms of Action of Deep Brain Stimulation" (EMBO Mol Med, 2019)
- "Fornix-Region Deep Brain Stimulation Induced Memory Flashbacks in Alzheimer's Disease" (N Engl J Med, 2019)
- "Trends and Disparities in Deep Brain Stimulation Utilization in the United States" (Lancet Reg Health Am, 2023)
