= Precision Neuroscience =

American brain-computer interface company

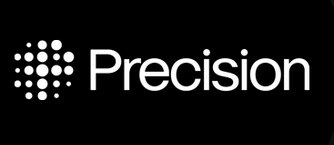
- Type: Private
- Industry: Technology
- Founded: 2021; 5 years ago
- Founder: Benjamin Rapoport, Michael Mager, Demetrios Papageorgiou, Mark Hettick
- Headquarters: New York City
- Key people: Michael Mager (CEO), Benjamin Rapoport and Craig Mermel
- Website: precisionneuro.io

Precision Neuroscience is an American brain–computer interface (BCI) company based in New York City and with offices in Santa Clara, California and Addison, Texas.

The company is building a minimally invasive brain–computer interface. The interface includes a thin-film microelectrode array that conforms to the brain surface without penetrating the brain tissue. It collects hundreds of times higher resolution neural data than traditional cortical surface arrays. The procedure to implant the device does not require a craniotomy, and the implantation is designed to be reversible. Precision Neuroscience aims to treat neurological conditions such as spinal cord injury, stroke, traumatic brain injury, and neurodegenerative conditions such as ALS.

== History ==
Precision Neuroscience was founded by Benjamin Rapoport, Michael Mager, Demetrios Papageorgiou, and Mark Hettick in 2021. Rapoport is a neurosurgeon in the Mount Sinai Health System in New York City, where he specializes in minimally invasive surgery. Rapoport received a PhD in electrical engineering and computer science from the Massachusetts Institute of Technology and a medical degree from Harvard Medical School. Rapoport was previously on the eight-member founding team at Elon Musk’s brain–computer interface company, Neuralink. Rapoport left Neuralink in 2018.

Rapoport, along with Michael Mager, an investor, and a team of experts in areas such as neuroscience, microfabrication and software launched Precision Neuroscience in 2021. Rapoport is the founding Chief Science Officer at Precision Neuroscience. Mager is the founding Chief Executive Officer.

In May 2021, Precision Neuroscience raised a $12 million Series A funding round led by Steadview Capital. In January 2023, the company raised a $41 million Series B funding round led by Forepont Capital Partners. Other early investors in Precision Neuroscience included B Capital, Mubadala Capital, Draper Associates, Alumni Ventures, and re.Mind Capital.

In June 2023, Precision Neuroscience completed its first-in-human clinical procedures, in collaboration with the Rockefeller Neuroscience Institute at West Virginia University, recording high-resolution neural activity from patients undergoing neurosurgery. In October 2023, Precision Neuroscience acquired a microelectromechanical systems MEMS manufacturing facility near Dallas, Texas, where the electrodes arrays are being manufactured.

In May 2024, Precision Neuroscience and the Mount Sinai Health System announced a world record for the most electrodes simultaneously recording cortical activity from a human brain, deploying 4,096 electrodes across four Layer 7 arrays during a single procedure.

In December 2024, Precision raised a $102 million Series C led by General Equity Holdings, with participation from B Capital, Duquesne Family Office, the investment firm of Stanley Druckenmiller, and Steadview Capital, at a post-money valuation of approximately $500 million. As of January 2026, total funding stood at $180 million.

In April 2025, the U.S. FDA granted 510(k) clearance for Precision’s Layer 7 Cortical Interface, authorizing commercial use for recording, monitoring, and stimulating on the brain’s surface for implantation durations of up to 30 days. Following FDA clearance, Precision Neuroscience began extended-duration implantation studies at six medical centers, allowing patients recovering from neurosurgery to use the device for up to 30 days in brain-computer interface tasks.

In November 2025, Precision received an investment from SCI Ventures, a venture fund focused on spinal cord injury and paralysis, backed by the Christopher & Dana Reeve Foundation, Wings for Life, and Spinal Research.

In January 2026, Precision Neuroscience and Medtronic formed a strategic partnership to co-develop an integrated system combining the Layer 7 cortical interface with Medtronic’s StealthStation surgical navigation platform.

== Technology ==
Precision Neuroscience is building a minimally invasive brain–computer interface. Its system, called the Layer 7 Cortical Interface, makes contact with the brain surface using a thin-film microelectrode array that conforms to the surface of the brain without damaging brain tissue. The array is one-fifth the thickness of a human hair and contains 1,024 microelectrodes, yielding a spatial resolution hundreds of times higher than traditional electrode arrays. Together with customized supporting electronics and software, the device provides a high-resolution view of cortical activity in real-time. The array is modular, and multiple arrays can be linked to cover multiple cortical regions simultaneously.

Precision Neuroscience developed a novel minimally invasive surgical procedure to implant the electrode arrays. To implant the device, a surgeon makes a thin slit in the skull, less than a millimeter in width. The system captures approximately one to two billion data points per patient per minute and uses AI algorithms to translate neural signals into computer commands in real time.The company is developing a fully implantable, wireless version of the system intended for long-term use in patients with paralysis.

== Testing ==
Precision Neuroscience has successfully used the Layer 7 Cortical Interface to record neural signals in animals and in human patients. In June 2023, Precision Neuroscience announced it had performed a pilot human clinical trial in collaboration with the Rockefeller Neuroscience Institute and the Department of Neurosurgery of the West Virginia University School of Medicine. According to WIRED, “the implants were able to read, record, and map electrical activity in part of the patients’ temporal lobes, which helps process sensory input.” In May 2023, the U.S. Food and Drug Administration granted Precision Neuroscience's system Breakthrough Device designation.

In March 2024, Precision Neuroscience announced expanded clinical studies at the Icahn School of Medicine in New York City and the Hospital of the University of Pennsylvania in Philadelphia.

The U.S. FDA granted 510(k) clearance for Precision's Layer 7 Cortical Interface in March of 2025. The Layer 7 Cortical Interface is authorized for commercial use, with implantation durations of up to 30 days.

In October 2025, Precision published results in Nature Biomedical Engineering demonstrating that its high-bandwidth brain–computer interface can be delivered without traditional open-brain surgery. The study combined preclinical animal studies with pilot human testing in five patients undergoing standard neurosurgical procedures. The system achieved high-resolution neural recordings and supported motor and sensory decoding as well as focal stimulation — at performance levels previously associated only with penetrating electrodes. In 2026, researchers at Johns Hopkins University reported real-time neural control of two-dimensional cursor movement as well as speech classification in four patients using the Layer 7 system.

In a study published in Neurosurgical Focus in February 2026, researchers at Johns Hopkins Hospital reported results from four patients who underwent awake craniotomy procedures using the Layer 7 device. The study demonstrated real-time speech classification with 77.5% accuracy on a four-word task and cursor control with 78–84% accuracy across four directional targets, achieved within a single intraoperative session of 20–30 minutes. No device-related adverse events were reported. The authors noted the study was limited by its small sample size.

Precision is a founding charter member of the Implantable BCI Collaborative Community (iBCI-CC), an initiative developed in partnership with the FDA in 2024. The company has stated that one of its near-term goals is a fully implantable wireless device to enable patients with paralysis to independently operate digital devices such as computers, smartphones, and productivity software. As of January 2026, the Layer 7 Cortical Interface had been tested in over 68 patients, according to the company.
