= Blindsight (Neuralink) =

Experimental medical device developed by Neuralink Corp

- Inception: September 2024

Blindsight is an experimental medical device developed by Neuralink. It has received Breakthrough Device Designation from the US Food and Drug Administration (FDA).

== Purpose ==
Blindsight is being developed to enable individuals with total visual impairment due to damage to the optic nerve but with intact visual cortex, to see. This is made possible by bypassing the optic nerve and directly stimulating the visual cortex to create a visual perception.

== See also ==
- Brainport
