= Naviance =

Educational readiness software provider

- Type: Private
- Industry: Software
- Founded: 2002; 24 years ago Washington, D.C., U.S.
- Founder: Stephen M. Smith; Shaun Fanning
- Headquarters: Arlington, Virginia, U.S.
- Area served: United States, including territories
- Key people: Stephen M. Smith (president); Shaun Fanning (executive vice president)
- Products: College readiness Software as a service Career assessment Test preparation School counseling tools
- Parent: PowerSchool
- Website: www.naviance.com

Naviance is an American college and career readiness software provider that partners with high schools and other K–12 institutions to provide students with college planning and career assessment tools. The company reports that its products reach more than 7 million students at nearly 8,500 schools in 100 countries.

== History and acquisitions ==
Naviance was founded in Washington, D.C., in 2002 by Steven R. Swanson, Stephen M. Smith and Shaun Fanning. Its offices are currently located in Arlington, Virginia. In 2007, Naviance was acquired by Hobsons, a subsidiary of the Daily Mail and General Trust (DMGT). Like Naviance, Hobsons is a technology company that works in the education field. In 2010, Naviance acquired the college recommendation engine MyFit, which uses data modeling to help students to identify colleges that match them academically and socially. In 2012, Naviance acquired PrepMe, a for-profit education company which produces tools to aid in preparation for PSAT, SAT and ACT tests. In 2021, Naviance was acquired by PowerSchool.

== Software ==
Naviance's web-based software as a service platform provides students with a variety of features, including college research and matching tools, course planning, career assessment and personality tests, and surveys to help students connect what they are doing in school to what they would like to do once they complete their education. Naviance provides additional functionality to school counselors to track the progress of individual students, communicate and collaborate with students and families, or create reports on their entire student population. Additionally, Naviance's integration with "The Common Application" facilitates the submission of college applications, as well as online submission of transcripts, school forms and recommendations through Naviance eDocs.

Naviance's scattergrams show the acceptance history of students within a particular high school to a specific college or university using the historical average GPAs and test scores from the high school. A Naviance scattergram is a scatter plot that shows students within a high school who were accepted, denied and wait-listed by a specific college using symbols in the graph legend.

In March 2013, the Naviance Student Mobile application was introduced for iOS devices. Naviance Student is a free application that allows students to search for colleges and to manage tasks associated with the college admissions process.

In March 2014, Hobsons announced the new Naviance College and Career Readiness Curriculum for middle and high school students. The curriculum, designed in collaboration with Roadtrip Nation, is geared towards helping address the aspirations-achievement gap that exists today in schools. The curriculum is designed to help students develop college knowledge and non-cognitive skills required to succeed in a post-secondary environment.

== Awards and recognition ==
In 2011, Naviance was included in District Administration magazine's Reader's Choice Top 100 Products list. In 2012, District Administration magazine reported that since it began using Naviance two years earlier, Minneapolis Public Schools saw an increase of 30 percent in the number of students who had post-secondary education and career plans, and the number of students attending a four-year college increased by 6 percent.

== Lawsuit ==
In 2023, Naviance and its parent company PowerSchool was sued by the Chicago Board of Education for digital wiretapping and selling user data to third-party companies for advertising purposes. The lawsuit was settled out of court for $17.25 million USD in 2026.

== See also ==
- College admissions in the United States
- University and college admission
- Common Core State Standards Initiative
- School counseling
- Career assessment
