= Nobuki =

- Gender: Male

Origin
- Origin: Japanese
- Meaning: Different meanings depending on the kanji used

Nobuki (written: 信生, 暢希 or ノブキ in katakana) is a masculine Japanese given name. Notable people with the name include:

- Nobuki Hara (原 信生; born 1979), Japanese footballer
- Nobuki Hizume (日爪 ノブキ; born 1979), Japanese fashion designer
- Nobuki Iketaka (池高 暢希; born 2000), Japanese footballer

== See also ==
- Nobuki Station, a former railway station in Akitakata, Hiroshima Prefecture, Japan
