= Brain–computer interface =

Connection between brain and computer

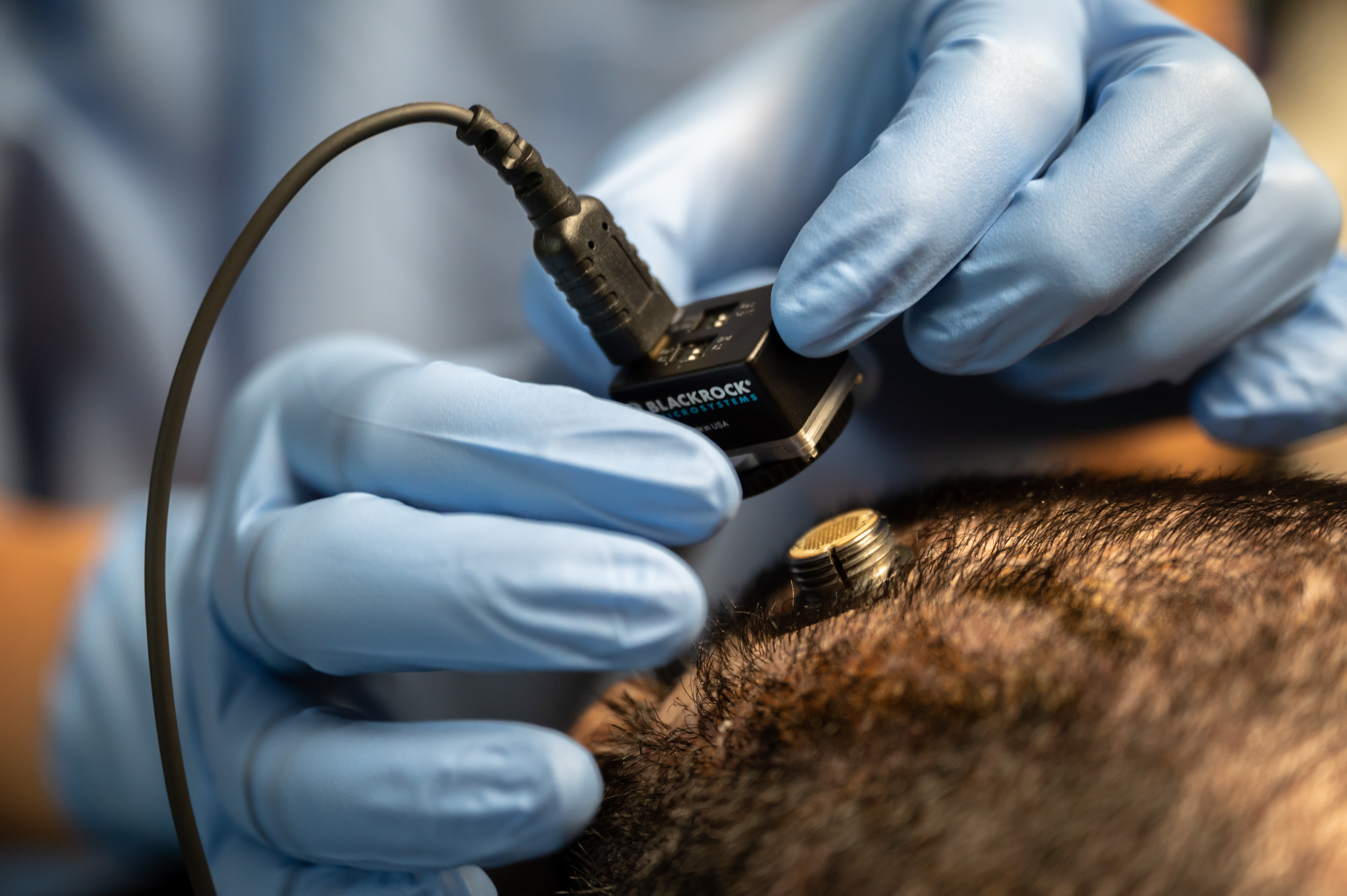
Participant in a brain–computer interface getting connected to a computer

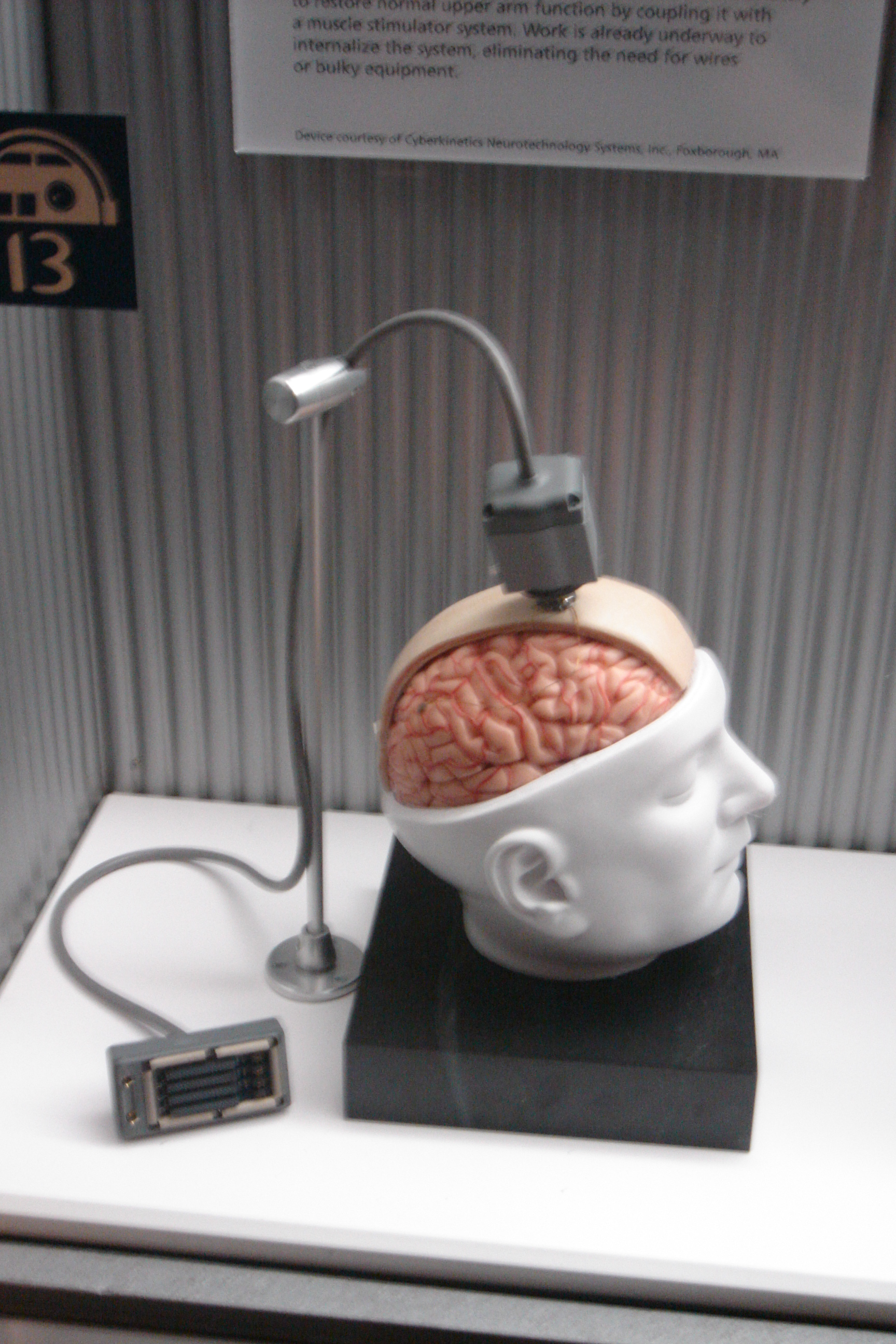
Dummy unit illustrating the design of a BrainGate interface

A brain–computer interface (BCI), sometimes called a brain–machine interface (BMI), is a system that measures brain activity and translates it into functionally useful outputs, allowing interaction with an external or internal system, most commonly a computer or robotic limb. BCIs are often directed at researching, mapping, assisting, augmenting, or repairing human cognitive or sensory-motor functions. Due to the cortical plasticity of the brain, signals from implanted prostheses can, after adaptation, be handled by the brain like natural sensor or effector channels. They are often conceptualized as a human–machine interface that skips the intermediary of moving body parts (e.g. hands or feet). BCI implementations range from non-invasive (EEG, MEG, MRI) and partially invasive (ECoG and endovascular) to invasive (microelectrode array) based on how physically close electrodes are to brain tissue.

Research on BCIs began in the 1970s by Jacques Vidal at the University of California, Los Angeles (UCLA) under a grant from the National Science Foundation. This was followed by a contract from the Defense Advanced Research Projects Agency (DARPA) that prompted further research into the technology. Vidal's 1973 paper introduced the expression brain–computer interface into scientific literature. Following years of animal experimentation, the first neuroprosthetic devices were implanted in humans in the mid-1990s

== History ==
The history of brain–computer interfaces (BCIs) starts with Hans Berger's discovery of the brain's electrical activity and the development of electroencephalography (EEG). In 1924 Berger was the first to record human brain activity utilizing EEG. Berger was able to identify oscillatory activity, such as the alpha wave (8–13 Hz), by analyzing EEG traces.

Berger's first recording device was rudimentary. He inserted silver wires under the scalps of his patients. These were later replaced by silver foils attached to the patient's head by rubber bandages. Berger connected these sensors to a Lippmann capillary electrometer, with disappointing results. However, more sophisticated measuring devices, such as the Siemens double-coil recording galvanometer, which displayed voltages as small as 10^{−4} volt, led to success.

Berger analyzed the interrelation of alternations in his EEG wave diagrams with brain diseases. EEGs permitted completely new possibilities for brain research.

Although the term had not yet been coined, one of the earliest examples of a working brain–machine interface was the piece Music for Solo Performer (1965) by American composer Alvin Lucier. The piece makes use of EEG and analog signal processing hardware (filters, amplifiers, and a mixing board) to stimulate acoustic percussion instruments. Performing the piece requires producing alpha waves and thereby "playing" the various instruments via loudspeakers that are placed near or directly on the instruments.

Jacques Vidal coined the term "BCI" and produced the first peer-reviewed publications on this topic. He is widely recognized as the inventor of BCIs. A review pointed out that Vidal's 1973 paper stated the "BCI challenge" of controlling external objects using EEG signals, and especially use of Contingent Negative Variation (CNV) potential as a challenge for BCI control. Vidal's 1977 experiment was the first application of BCI after his 1973 BCI challenge. It was a noninvasive EEG (actually Visual Evoked Potentials (VEP)) control of a cursor-like graphical object on a computer screen. The demonstration was movement in a maze.

1988 was the first demonstration of noninvasive EEG control of a physical object, a robot. The experiment demonstrated EEG control of multiple start-stop-restart cycles of movement, along an arbitrary trajectory defined by a line drawn on a floor. The line-following behavior was the default robot behavior, utilizing autonomous intelligence and an autonomous energy source.

In 1990, a report was given on a closed loop, bidirectional, adaptive BCI controlling a computer buzzer by an anticipatory brain potential, the Contingent Negative Variation (CNV) potential. The experiment described how an expectation state of the brain, manifested by CNV, used a feedback loop to control the S2 buzzer in the S1-S2-CNV paradigm. The resulting cognitive wave representing the expectation learning in the brain was termed Electroexpectogram (EXG). The CNV brain potential was part of Vidal's 1973 challenge.

Studies in the 2010s suggested neural stimulation's potential to restore functional connectivity and associated behaviors through modulation of molecular mechanisms. This opened the door for the concept that BCI technologies may be able to restore function.

In 2011, Thorsten O. Zander introduced the concept of passive brain–computer interface.

Beginning in 2013, DARPA funded BCI technology through the BRAIN initiative, which supported work out of teams including University of Pittsburgh Medical Center, Paradromics, Brown, and Synchron.

== Neuroprosthetics ==
Neuroprosthetics is an area of neuroscience concerned with neural prostheses, that is, using artificial devices to replace the function of impaired nervous systems and brain-related problems, or of sensory or other organs (bladder, diaphragm, etc.). As of December 2010, cochlear implants, the first neuroprosthetic device, had been implanted in some 736,900 people worldwide. Other neuroprosthetic devices aim to restore vision, including retinal implants.

The terms are sometimes used interchangeably. Neuroprosthetics and BCIs seek to achieve the same aims, such as restoring sight, hearing, movement, ability to communicate, and even cognitive function. Both use similar experimental methods and surgical techniques.

== Animal research ==
Several laboratories have managed to read signals from monkey and rat cerebral cortices to operate BCIs to produce movement. Monkeys have moved computer cursors and commanded robotic arms to perform simple tasks simply by thinking about the task and seeing the results, without motor output. In May 2008 photographs that showed a monkey at the University of Pittsburgh Medical Center operating a robotic arm by thinking were published in multiple studies. Sheep have also been used to evaluate BCI technology, including Synchron's Stentrode and Paradromics' Connexus BCI.

In 2020, Elon Musk's Neuralink was successfully implanted in a pig. In 2021, Musk announced that the company had successfully enabled a monkey to play video games using Neuralink's device.

=== Early work ===
Monkey operating a robotic arm with brain–computer interfacing (Schwartz lab, University of Pittsburgh)

In 1969 operant conditioning studies by Fetz et al. at the Regional Primate Research Center and Department of Physiology and Biophysics, University of Washington School of Medicine showed that monkeys could learn to control the deflection of a biofeedback arm with neural activity. Similar work in the 1970s established that monkeys could learn to control the firing rates of individual and multiple neurons in the primary motor cortex if they were rewarded accordingly.

Algorithms to reconstruct movements from motor cortex neurons, which control movement, date back to the 1970s. In the 1980s, Dr. Apostolos P. Georgopoulos at Johns Hopkins University found a mathematical relationship between the electrical responses of single motor cortex neurons in rhesus macaque monkeys and the direction in which they moved their arms. He also found that dispersed groups of neurons, in different areas of the monkey's brains, collectively controlled motor commands. He was able to record the firings of neurons in only one area at a time, due to equipment limitations.

Several groups have been able to capture complex brain motor cortex signals by recording from neural ensembles (groups of neurons) and using these to control external devices.

=== Research ===
==== Kennedy and Yang Dan ====
Phillip Kennedy (Neural Signals founder (1987) and colleagues built the first intracortical brain–computer interface by implanting neurotrophic-cone electrodes into monkeys.

Yang Dan and colleagues' recordings of cat vision using a BCI implanted in the lateral geniculate nucleus (top row: original image; bottom row: recording)

In 1999, Yang Dan et al. at University of California, Berkeley decoded neuronal firings to reproduce images from cats. The team used an array of electrodes embedded in the thalamus (which integrates the brain's sensory input). Researchers targeted 177 brain cells in the thalamus lateral geniculate nucleus area, which decodes signals from the retina. Neuron firings were recorded from watching eight short movies. Using mathematical filters, the researchers decoded the signals to reconstruct recognizable scenes and moving objects.

==== Nicolelis ====
Duke University professor Miguel Nicolelis advocates using multiple electrodes spread over a greater area of the brain to obtain neuronal signals.

After initial studies in rats during the 1990s, Nicolelis and colleagues developed BCIs that decoded brain activity in owl monkeys and used the devices to reproduce monkey movements in robotic arms. Monkeys' advanced reaching and grasping abilities and hand manipulation skills, made them good test subjects.

By 2000, the group succeeded in building a BCI that reproduced owl monkey movements while the monkey operated a joystick or reached for food. The BCI operated in real time and could remotely control a separate robot. But the monkeys received no feedback (open-loop BCI).

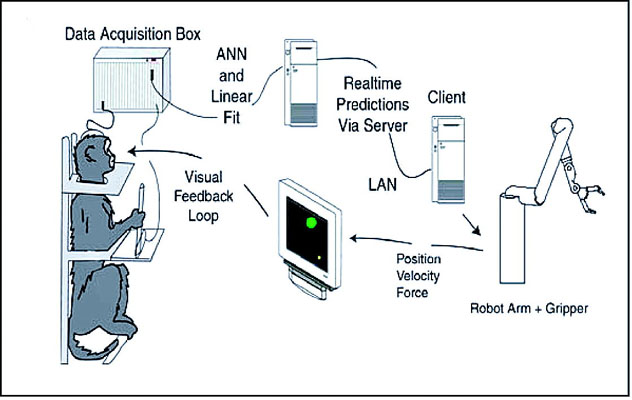
Diagram of the BCI developed by Miguel Nicolelis and colleagues for use on rhesus monkeys

Later experiments on rhesus monkeys included feedback and reproduced monkey reaching and grasping movements in a robot arm. Their deeply cleft and furrowed brains made them better models for human neurophysiology than owl monkeys. The monkeys were trained to reach and grasp objects on a computer screen by manipulating a joystick while corresponding movements by a robot arm were hidden. The monkeys were later shown the robot and learned to control it by viewing its movements. The BCI used velocity predictions to control reaching movements and simultaneously predicted gripping force.

In 2011, O'Doherty and colleagues showed a BCI with sensory feedback with rhesus monkeys. The monkey controlled the position of an avatar arm while receiving sensory feedback through direct intracortical stimulation (ICMS) in the arm representation area of the sensory cortex.

==== Donoghue, Schwartz, and Andersen ====
Other laboratories that have developed BCIs and algorithms that decode neuron signals include John Donoghue at the Carney Institute for Brain Science at Brown University, Andrew Schwartz at the University of Pittsburgh, and Richard Andersen at Caltech. These researchers produced working BCIs using recorded signals from far fewer neurons than Nicolelis (15–30 neurons versus 50–200 neurons).

The Carney Institute reported training rhesus monkeys to use a BCI to track visual targets on a computer screen (closed-loop BCI) with or without a joystick. The group created a BCI for three-dimensional tracking in virtual reality and reproduced BCI control in a robotic arm. The same group demonstrated that a monkey could feed itself pieces of fruit and marshmallows using a robotic arm controlled by the animal's brain signals.

Andersen's group used recordings of premovement activity from the posterior parietal cortex, including signals created when experimental animals anticipated receiving a reward.

==== Other research ====
In addition to predicting kinematic and kinetic parameters of limb movements, BCIs that predict electromyographic or electrical activity of the muscles of primates are in process. Such BCIs could restore mobility in paralyzed limbs by electrically stimulating muscles.

Nicolelis and colleagues demonstrated that large neural ensembles can predict arm position. This work allowed BCIs to read arm movement intentions and translate them into actuator movements. Carmena and colleagues programmed a BCI that allowed a monkey to control reaching and grasping movements by a robotic arm. Lebedev and colleagues argued that brain networks reorganize to create a new representation of the robotic appendage in addition to the representation of the animal's own limbs.

In 2019, researchers from the University of San Francisco, California, initiated a brain–computer interface (BCI) study that had the potential to aid patients with speech impairment resulting from neurological disorders. Their BCI utilized high-density electrocorticography to capture neural activity from a patient's brain and employed deep learning to synthesize speech. In 2021, those researchers reported the potential of a BCI to decode words and sentences in an anarthric patient who had been unable to speak for over 15 years.

The biggest impediment to BCI technology is the lack of a sensor modality that provides safe, accurate and robust access to brain signals. The use of a better sensor expands the range of communication functions that can be provided using a BCI.

Development and implementation of a BCI system is complex and time-consuming. In response to this problem, Gerwin Schalk has been developing BCI2000, a general-purpose system for BCI research, since 2000.

A new 'wireless' approach uses light-gated ion channels such as channelrhodopsin to control the activity of genetically defined subsets of neurons in vivo. In the context of a simple learning task, illumination of transfected cells in the somatosensory cortex influenced decision-making in mice.

BCIs led to a deeper understanding of neural networks and the central nervous system. Research has reported that despite neuroscientists' inclination to believe that neurons have the most effect when working together, single neurons can be conditioned through the use of BCIs to fire in a pattern that allows primates to control motor outputs. BCIs led to development of the single neuron insufficiency principle that states that even with a well-tuned firing rate, single neurons can only carry limited information and therefore the highest level of accuracy is achieved by recording ensemble firings. Other principles discovered with BCIs include the neuronal multitasking principle, the neuronal mass principle, the neural degeneracy principle, and the plasticity principle.

BCIs are proposed to be applied by users without disabilities. Passive BCIs allow for assessing and interpreting changes in the user state during Human–computer interaction (HCI). In a secondary, implicit control loop, the system adapts to its user, improving its usability.

BCI systems can potentially be used to encode signals from the periphery. These sensory BCI devices enable real-time, behaviorally-relevant decisions based upon closed-loop neural stimulation.

== Human research ==
=== Invasive BCIs ===
Invasive BCI requires surgery to implant electrodes under the scalp for accessing brain signals. The main advantage is to increase accuracy. Downsides include side effects from the surgery, including scar tissue that can obstruct brain signals, or the body potentially rejecting the implanted electrodes.

==== Vision ====
Invasive BCI research has targeted repairing damaged sight and providing new functionality for people with paralysis. Invasive BCIs are implanted directly into the grey matter of the brain during neurosurgery. Because they lie in the grey matter, invasive devices produce the highest quality signals of BCI devices but are prone to scar-tissue build-up, causing the signal to weaken, or disappear, as the body reacts to the foreign object.

In vision science, direct brain implants have been used to treat non-congenital (acquired) blindness. One of the first scientists to produce a working brain interface to restore sight was private researcher William Dobelle. Dobelle's first prototype was implanted into "Jerry", a man blinded in adulthood, in 1978. A single-array BCI containing 68 electrodes was implanted onto Jerry's visual cortex and succeeded in producing phosphenes, the sensation of seeing light. The system included cameras mounted on glasses to send signals to the implant. Initially, the implant allowed Jerry to see shades of grey in a limited field of vision at a low frame-rate. This also required him to be hooked up to a mainframe computer, but shrinking electronics and faster computers made his artificial eye more portable and now enable him to perform simple tasks unassisted.

In 2002, Jens Naumann, also blinded in adulthood, became the first in a series of 16 paying patients to receive Dobelle's second generation implant, one of the earliest commercial uses of BCIs. The second generation device used a more sophisticated implant enabling better mapping of phosphenes into coherent vision. Phosphenes are spread out across the visual field in what researchers call "the starry-night effect". Immediately after his implant, Jens was able to use his imperfectly restored vision to drive an automobile slowly around the parking area of the research institute. Dobelle died in 2004 before his processes and developments were documented, leaving no one to continue his work. Subsequently, Naumann and the other patients in the program began having problems with their vision, and eventually lost their "sight" again.

==== Movement ====
BCIs focusing on motor neuroprosthetics aim to restore movement in individuals with paralysis or provide devices to assist them, such as interfaces with computers or robot arms.

Kennedy and Bakay were first to install a human brain implant that produced signals of high enough quality to simulate movement. Their patient, Johnny Ray (1944–2002), developed 'locked-in syndrome' after a brain-stem stroke in 1997. Ray's implant was installed in 1998 and he lived long enough to start working with the implant, eventually learning to control a computer cursor; he died in 2002 of a brain aneurysm.

Tetraplegic Matt Nagle became the first person to control an artificial hand using a BCI in 2005 as part of the first nine-month human trial of Cyberkinetics's BrainGate chip-implant. Implanted in Nagle's right precentral gyrus (area of the motor cortex for arm movement), the 96-electrode implant allowed Nagle to control a robotic arm by thinking about moving his hand as well as a computer cursor, lights and TV. One year later, Jonathan Wolpaw received the Altran Foundation for Innovation prize for developing a Brain Computer Interface with electrodes located on the surface of the skull, instead of directly in the brain.

Research teams led by the BrainGate group and another at University of Pittsburgh Medical Center, both in collaborations with the United States Department of Veterans Affairs (VA), demonstrated control of prosthetic limbs with many degrees of freedom using direct connections to arrays of neurons in the motor cortex of tetraplegia patients.

==== Communication ====
In May 2021, a Stanford University team reported a successful proof-of-concept test that enabled a quadraplegic participant to produce English sentences at about 86 characters per minute and 18 words per minute. The participant imagined moving his hand to write letters, and the system performed handwriting recognition on electrical signals detected in the motor cortex, utilizing Hidden Markov models and recurrent neural networks. Since researchers from UCSF initiated a brain–computer interface (BCI) study, numerous reports have been made. In 2021, they reported that a paralyzed and with anarthria man was able to communicate fifteen words per minute using an implanted device that examined nerve cells controlling the muscles of the vocal tract. In addition in 2022 it was announced that their implant could also be used to spell out words and entire sentences without speaking aloud. The first bilingual speech neuroprosthesis was reported to have been developed by the same team at the University of San Francisco, in 2024. in 2025, in the beginning of the year, an article was published. The UCSF researchers reported that a man was able to control a robotic arm just by thinking.

In a review article, authors wondered whether human information transfer rates can surpass that of language with BCIs. Language research has reported that information transfer rates are relatively constant across many languages. This may reflect the brain's information processing limit. Alternatively, this limit may be intrinsic to language itself, as a modality for information transfer.

In 2023, two studies used BCIs with recurrent neural network to decode speech at a record rate of 62 words per minute and 78 words per minute.

==== Technical challenges ====
There exists a number of technical challenges to recording brain activity with invasive BCIs. Advances in CMOS technology are pushing and enabling integrated, invasive BCI designs with smaller size, lower power requirements, and higher signal acquisition capabilities. Invasive BCIs involve electrodes that penetrate brain tissue in an attempt to record action potential signals (also known as spikes) from individual, or small groups of, neurons near the electrode. The interface between a recording electrode and the electrolytic solution surrounding neurons has been modelled using the Hodgkin-Huxley model.

Electronic limitations to invasive BCIs have been an active area of research in recent decades. While intracellular recordings of neurons reveal action potential voltages on the scale of hundreds of millivolts, chronic invasive BCIs rely on recording extracellular voltages which typically are three orders of magnitude smaller, existing at hundreds of microvolts. Further adding to the challenge of detecting signals on the scale of microvolts is the fact that the electrode-tissue interface has a high capacitance at small voltages. Due to the nature of these small signals, for BCI systems that incorporate functionality onto an integrated circuit, each electrode requires its own amplifier and ADC, which convert analog extracellular voltages into digital signals. Because a typical neuron action potential lasts for one millisecond, BCIs measuring spikes must have sampling rates ranging from 300 Hz to 5 kHz. Yet another concern is that invasive BCIs must be low-power, so as to dissipate less heat to surrounding tissue; at the most basic level more power is traditionally needed to optimize signal-to-noise ratio. Optimal battery design is an active area of research in BCIs.

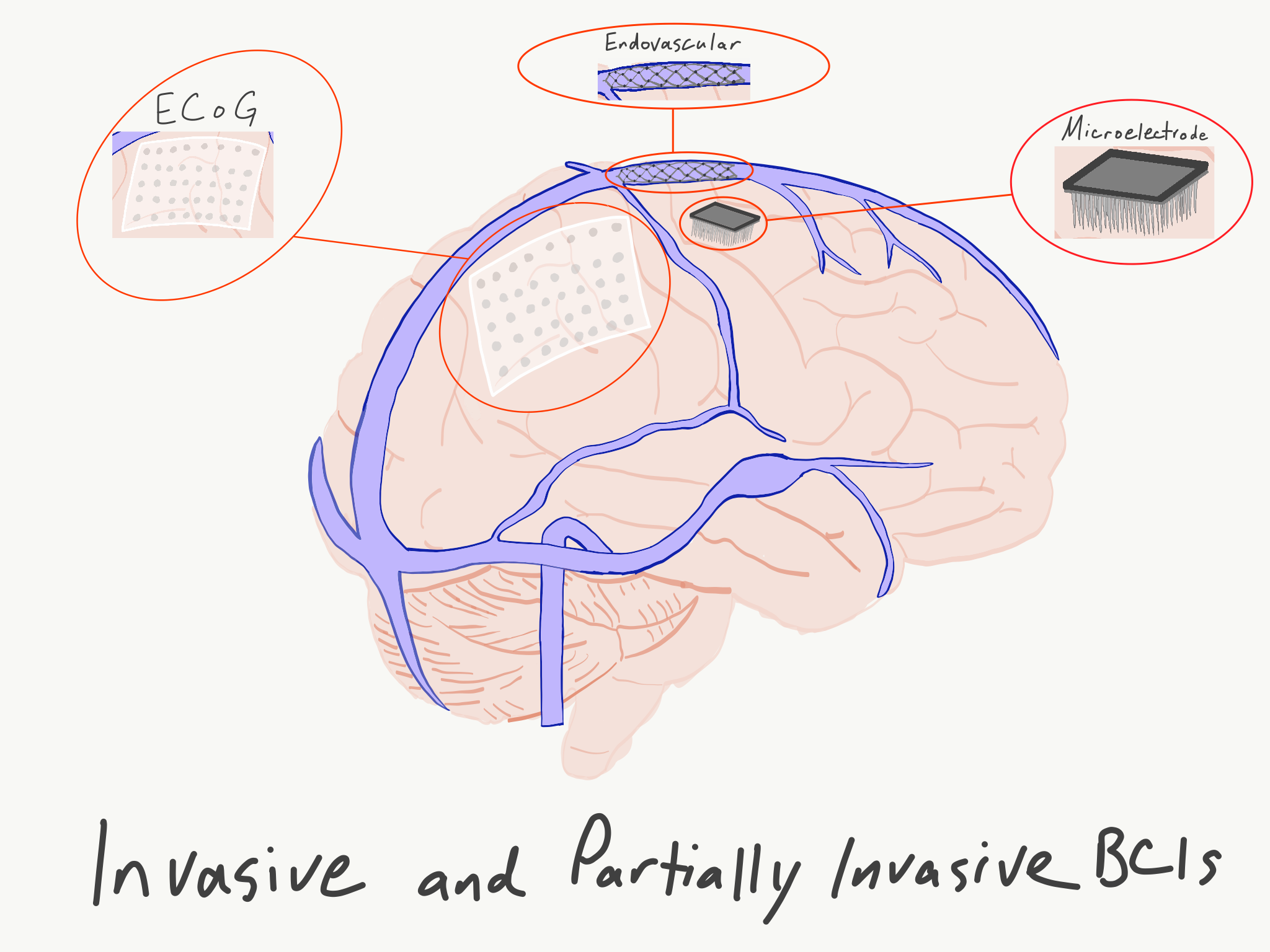
Illustration of invasive and partially invasive BCIs: electrocorticography (ECoG), endovascular, and intracortical microelectrode.

Challenges existing in the area of material science are central to the design of invasive BCIs. Variations in signal quality over time have been commonly observed with implantable microelectrodes. It is also difficult to keep recordings stable over long periods, especially as the body reacts to implanted electrodes and affects signal quality. Optimal material and mechanical characteristics for long term signal stability in invasive BCIs has been an active area of research. It has been proposed that the formation of glial scarring, secondary to damage at the electrode-tissue interface, is likely responsible for electrode failure and reduced recording performance. Research has suggested that blood–brain barrier leakage, either at the time of insertion or over time, may be responsible for the inflammatory and glial reaction to chronic microelectrodes implanted in the brain. As a result, flexible and tissue-like designs have been researched and developed to minimize foreign-body reaction by means of matching the Young's modulus of the electrode closer to that of brain tissue.

=== Partially invasive BCIs ===
Partially invasive BCI devices are implanted inside the skull but rest outside the brain rather than within the grey matter. They produce higher resolution signals than non-invasive BCIs where the bone tissue of the cranium deflects and deforms signals and have a lower risk of forming scar-tissue in the brain than fully invasive BCIs. Preclinical demonstration of intracortical BCIs from the stroke perilesional cortex has been conducted.

==== Endovascular ====
A systematic review published in 2020 detailed multiple clinical and non-clinical studies investigating the feasibility of endovascular BCIs.

In 2010, researchers affiliated with University of Melbourne began developing a BCI that could be inserted via the vascular system. Australian neurologist Thomas Oxley conceived the idea for this BCI, called Stentrode, earning funding from DARPA. Preclinical studies evaluated the technology in sheep.

Stentrode is a monolithic stent electrode array designed to be delivered via an intravenous catheter under image-guidance to the superior sagittal sinus, in the region which lies adjacent to the motor cortex. This proximity enables Stentrode to measure neural activity. The procedure is most similar to how venous sinus stents are placed for the treatment of idiopathic intracranial hypertension. Stentrode communicates neural activity to a battery-less telemetry unit implanted in the chest, which communicates wirelessly with an external telemetry unit capable of power and data transfer. While an endovascular BCI benefits from avoiding a craniotomy for insertion, risks such as clotting and venous thrombosis exist.

Human trials with Stentrode were underway as of 2021. In November 2020, two participants with amyotrophic lateral sclerosis were able to wirelessly control an operating system to text, email, shop, and bank using direct thought using Stentrode, marking the first time a brain–computer interface was implanted via the patient's blood vessels, eliminating the need for brain surgery. In January 2023, researchers reported no serious adverse events during the first year for all four patients, who could use it to operate computers.

==== Electrocorticography ====
Electrocorticography (ECoG) measures brain electrical activity from beneath the skull in a way similar to non-invasive electroencephalography, using electrodes embedded in a thin plastic pad placed above the cortex, beneath the dura mater. ECoG technologies were first trialled in humans in 2004 by Eric Leuthardt and Daniel Moran from Washington University in St. Louis. In a later trial, the researchers enabled a teenage boy to play Space Invaders. This research indicates that control is rapid, requires minimal training, balancing signal fidelity and level of invasiveness. (Note: These electrodes had not been implanted in the patient with the intention of developing a BCI. The patient had had severe epilepsy and the electrodes were temporarily implanted to help his physicians localize seizure foci; the BCI researchers simply took advantage of this.)

Signals can be either subdural or epidural, but are not taken from within the brain parenchyma. Patients are required to have invasive monitoring for localization and resection of an epileptogenic focus.

ECoG offers higher spatial resolution, better signal-to-noise ratio, wider frequency range, and less training requirements than scalp-recorded EEG, and at the same time has lower technical difficulty, lower clinical risk, and may have superior long-term stability than intracortical single-neuron recording. This feature profile and evidence of the high level of control with minimal training requirements shows potential for real world application for people with motor disabilities.

Edward Chang and Joseph Makin from UCSF reported that ECoG signals could be used to decode speech from epilepsy patients implanted with high-density ECoG arrays over the peri-Sylvian cortices. They reported word error rates of 3% (a marked improvement from prior efforts) utilizing an encoder-decoder neural network, which translated ECoG data into one of fifty sentences composed of 250 unique words.

==== Functional near-infrared spectroscopy ====
In 2014, a BCI using functional near-infrared spectroscopy for "locked-in" patients with amyotrophic lateral sclerosis (ALS) was able to restore basic ability to communicate.

==== Electroencephalography (EEG)-based brain–computer interfaces ====
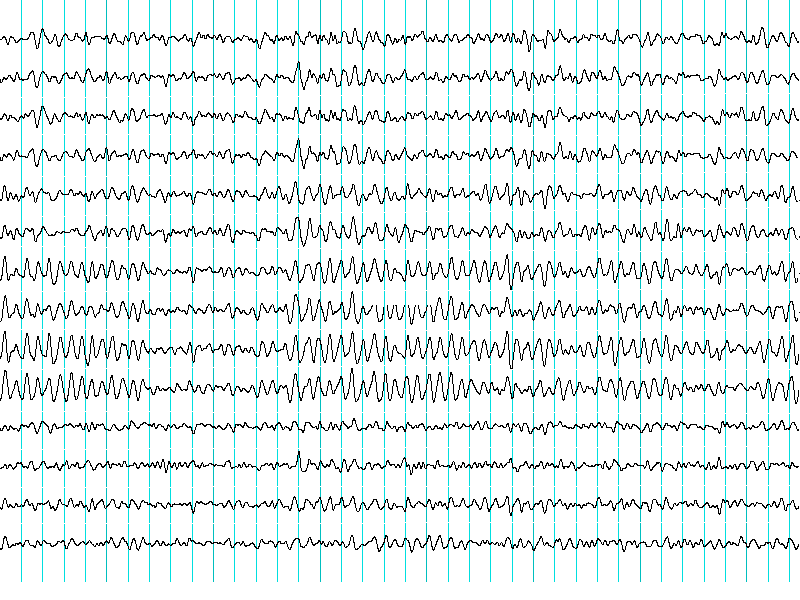
Recordings of brainwaves produced by an electroencephalogram

After Vidal stated the BCI challenge, the initial reports on non-invasive approaches included control of a cursor in 2D using VEP, control of a buzzer using CNV, control of a physical object, a robot, using a brain rhythm (alpha), control of a text written on a screen using P300.

In the early days of BCI research, another substantial barrier to using EEG was that extensive training was required. For example, in experiments beginning in the mid-1990s, Niels Birbaumer at the University of Tübingen in Germany trained paralysed people to self-regulate the slow cortical potentials in their EEG to such an extent that these signals could be used as a binary signal to control a computer cursor. (Birbaumer had earlier trained epileptics to prevent impending fits by controlling this low voltage wave.) The experiment trained ten patients to move a computer cursor. The process was slow, requiring more than an hour for patients to write 100 characters with the cursor, while training often took months. The slow cortical potential approach has fallen away in favor of approaches that require little or no training, are faster and more accurate, and work for a greater proportion of users.

Another research parameter is the type of oscillatory activity that is measured. Gert Pfurtscheller founded the BCI Lab 1991 and conducted the first online BCI based on oscillatory features and classifiers. Together with Birbaumer and Jonathan Wolpaw at New York State University they focused on developing technology that would allow users to choose the brain signals they found easiest to operate a BCI, including mu and beta rhythms.

A further parameter is the method of feedback used as shown in studies of P300 signals. Patterns of P300 waves are generated involuntarily (stimulus-feedback) when people see something they recognize and may allow BCIs to decode categories of thoughts without training.

A 2005 study reported EEG emulation of digital control circuits, using a CNV flip-flop. A 2009 study reported noninvasive EEG control of a robotic arm using a CNV flip-flop. A 2011 study reported control of two robotic arms solving Tower of Hanoi task with three disks using a CNV flip-flop. A 2015 study described EEG-emulation of a Schmitt trigger, flip-flop, demultiplexer, and modem.

Advances by Bin He and his team at University of Minnesota suggest the potential of EEG-based brain–computer interfaces to accomplish tasks close to invasive brain–computer interfaces. Using advanced functional neuroimaging including BOLD functional MRI and EEG source imaging, They identified the co-variation and co-localization of electrophysiological and hemodynamic signals. Refined by a neuroimaging approach and a training protocol, they fashioned a non-invasive EEG based brain–computer interface to control the flight of a virtual helicopter in 3-dimensional space, based upon motor imagination. In June 2013 they announced a technique to guide a remote-control helicopter through an obstacle course. They also solved the EEG inverse problem and then used the resulting virtual EEG for BCI tasks. Well-controlled studies suggested the merits of such a source analysis-based BCI.

A 2014 study reported that severely motor-impaired patients could communicate faster and more reliably with non-invasive EEG BCI than with muscle-based communication channels.

A 2019 study reported that the application of evolutionary algorithms could improve EEG mental state classification with a non-invasive Muse device, enabling classification of data acquired by a consumer-grade sensing device.

In a 2021 systematic review of randomized controlled trials using BCI for post-stroke upper-limb rehabilitation, EEG-based BCI was reported to have efficacy in improving upper-limb motor function compared to control therapies. More specifically, BCI studies that utilized band power features, motor imagery, and functional electrical stimulation were reported to be more effective than alternatives. Another 2021 systematic review focused on post-stroke robot-assisted EEG-based BCI for hand rehabilitation. Improvement in motor assessment scores was observed in three of eleven studies.

==== Dry active electrode arrays ====
In the early 1990s Babak Taheri, at University of California, Davis demonstrated the first single and multichannel dry active electrode arrays. The arrayed electrode was demonstrated to perform well compared to silver/silver chloride electrodes. The device consisted of four sensor sites with integrated electronics to reduce noise by impedance matching. The advantages of such electrodes are:

- no electrolyte used,
- no skin preparation,
- significantly reduced sensor size,
- compatibility with EEG monitoring systems.

The active electrode array is an integrated system containing an array of capacitive sensors with local integrated circuitry packaged with batteries to power the circuitry. This level of integration was required to achieve the result.

The electrode was tested on a test bench and on human subjects in four modalities, namely:

- spontaneous EEG,
- sensory event-related potentials,
- brain stem potentials,
- cognitive event-related potentials.

Performance compared favorably with that of standard wet electrodes in terms of skin preparation, no gel requirements (dry), and higher signal-to-noise ratio.

In 1999 Hunter Peckham and others at Case Western Reserve University used a 64-electrode EEG skullcap to return limited hand movements to a quadriplegic. As he concentrated on simple but opposite concepts like up and down. A basic pattern was identified in his beta-rhythm EEG output and used to control a switch: Above average activity was interpreted as on, below average off. The signals were also used to drive nerve controllers embedded in his hands, restoring some movement.

==== SSVEP mobile EEG BCIs ====
In 2009, the NCTU Brain–Computer-Interface-headband was announced. Those researchers also engineered silicon-based microelectro-mechanical system (MEMS) dry electrodes designed for application to non-hairy body sites. These electrodes were secured to the headband's DAQ board with snap-on electrode holders. The signal processing module measured alpha activity and transferred it over Bluetooth to a phone that assessed the patients' alertness and cognitive capacity. When the subject became drowsy, the phone sent arousing feedback to the operator to rouse them.

In 2011, researchers reported a cellular based BCI that could cause a phone to ring. The wearable system was composed of a four channel bio-signal acquisition/amplification module, a communication module, and a Bluetooth phone. The electrodes were placed to pick up steady state visual evoked potentials (SSVEPs). SSVEPs are electrical responses to flickering visual stimuli with repetition rates over 6 Hz that are best found in the parietal and occipital scalp regions of the visual cortex. It was reported that all study participants were able to initiate the phone call with minimal practice in natural environments.

The scientists reported that a single channel fast Fourier transform (FFT) and multiple channel system canonical correlation analysis (CCA) algorithm can support mobile BCIs. The CCA algorithm has been applied in experiments investigating BCIs with claimed high accuracy and speed. Cellular BCI technology can reportedly be translated for other applications, such as picking up sensorimotor mu/beta rhythms to function as a motor-imagery based BCI.

In 2013, comparative tests performed on Android cell phone, tablet, and computer based BCIs, analyzed the power spectrum density of resultant EEG SSVEPs. The stated goals of this study were to "increase the practicability, portability, and ubiquity of an SSVEP-based BCI, for daily use". It was reported that the stimulation frequency on all mediums was accurate, although the phone's signal was not stable. The amplitudes of the SSVEPs for the laptop and tablet were reported to be larger than those of the cell phone. These two qualitative characterizations were suggested as indicators of the feasibility of using a mobile stimulus BCI.

One of the difficulties with EEG readings is susceptibility to motion artifacts. In most research projects, the participants were asked to sit still in a laboratory setting, reducing head and eye movements as much as possible. However, since these initiatives were intended to create a mobile device for daily use, the technology had to be tested in motion. In 2013, researchers tested mobile EEG-based BCI technology, measuring SSVEPs from participants as they walked on a treadmill. Reported results were that as speed increased, SSVEP detectability using CCA decreased. Independent component analysis (ICA) had been shown to be efficient in separating EEG signals from noise. The researchers stated that CCA data with and without ICA processing were similar. They concluded that CCA demonstrated robustness to motion artifacts. EEG-based BCI applications offer low spatial resolution. Possible solutions include: EEG source connectivity based on graph theory, EEG pattern recognition based on Topomap and EEG-fMRI fusion.

==== Prosthesis and environment control ====
Non-invasive BCIs have been applied to prosthetic upper and lower extremity devices in people with paralysis. For example, Gert Pfurtscheller of Graz University of Technology and colleagues demonstrated a BCI-controlled functional electrical stimulation system to restore upper extremity movements in a person with tetraplegia due to spinal cord injury. Between 2012 and 2013, researchers at University of California, Irvine demonstrated for the first time that BCI technology can restore brain-controlled walking after spinal cord injury. In their study, a person with paraplegia operated a BCI-robotic gait orthosis to regain basic ambulation. In 2009 independent researcher Alex Blainey used the Emotiv EPOC to control a 5 axis robot arm. He made several demonstrations of mind controlled wheelchairs and home automation.

==== Magnetoencephalography and fMRI ====
ATR Labs' reconstruction of human vision using fMRI (top row: original image; bottom row: reconstruction from mean of combined readings)

Magnetoencephalography (MEG) and functional magnetic resonance imaging (fMRI) have both been used as non-invasive BCIs. In a widely reported experiment, fMRI allowed two users to play Pong in real-time by altering their haemodynamic response or brain blood flow through biofeedback.

fMRI measurements of haemodynamic responses in real time have also been used to control robot arms with a seven-second delay between thought and movement.

In 2008, research developed in the Advanced Telecommunications Research (ATR) Computational Neuroscience Laboratories in Kyoto, Japan, allowed researchers to reconstruct images from brain signals at a resolution of 10×10 pixels.

A 2011 study reported second-by-second reconstruction of videos watched by the study's subjects, from fMRI data. This was achieved by creating a statistical model relating videos to brain activity. This model was then used to look up 100 one-second video segments, in a database of 18 million seconds of random YouTube videos, matching visual patterns to brain activity recorded when subjects watched a video. These 100 one-second video extracts were then combined into a mash-up image that resembled the video.

==== BCI control strategies in neurogaming ====
===== Motor imagery =====
Motor imagery involves imagining the movement of body parts, activating the sensorimotor cortex, which modulates sensorimotor oscillations in the EEG. This can be detected by the BCI and used to infer user intent. Motor imagery typically requires training to acquire acceptable control. Training sessions typically consume hours over several days. Regardless of the duration of the training session, users are unable to master the control scheme. This results in very slow pace of the gameplay. Machine learning methods were used to compute a subject-specific model for detecting motor imagery performance. The top performing algorithm from BCI Competition IV in 2022 dataset 2 for motor imagery was the Filter Bank Common Spatial Pattern, developed by Ang et al. from A*STAR, Singapore.

===== Bio/neurofeedback for passive BCI designs =====
Biofeedback can be used to monitor a subject's mental relaxation. In some cases, biofeedback does not match EEG, while parameters such as electromyography (EMG), galvanic skin resistance (GSR), and heart rate variability (HRV) can do so. Many biofeedback systems treat disorders such as attention deficit hyperactivity disorder (ADHD), sleep problems in children, teeth grinding, and chronic pain. EEG biofeedback systems typically monitor four brainwave bands (theta: 4–7 Hz, alpha:8–12 Hz, SMR: 12–15 Hz, beta: 15–18 Hz) and challenge the subject to control them. Passive BCI uses BCI to enrich human–machine interaction with information on the user's mental state, for example, simulations that detect when users intend to push brakes during emergency vehicle braking. Game developers using passive BCIs understand that through repetition of game levels the user's cognitive state adapts. During the first play of a given level, the player reacts differently than during subsequent plays: for example, the user is less surprised by an event that they expect.

===== Visual evoked potential (VEP) =====
A VEP is an electrical potential recorded after a subject is presented with a visual stimuli. The types of VEPs include SSVEPs and P300 potential.

Steady-state visually evoked potentials (SSVEPs) use potentials generated by exciting the retina, using visual stimuli modulated at certain frequencies. SSVEP stimuli are often formed from alternating checkerboard patterns and at times use flashing images. The frequency of the phase reversal of the stimulus used can be distinguished by EEG; this makes detection of SSVEP stimuli relatively easy. SSVEP is used within many BCI systems. This is due to several factors. The signal elicited is measurable in as large a population as the transient VEP and blink movement. Electrocardiographic artefacts do not affect the frequencies monitored. The SSVEP signal is robust; the topographic organization of the primary visual cortex is such that a broader area obtains afferents from the visual field's central or fovial region. SSVEP comes with problems. As SSVEPs use flashing stimuli to infer user intent, the user must gaze at one of the flashing or iterating symbols in order to interact with the system. It is, therefore, likely that the symbols become irritating and uncomfortable during longer play sessions.

Another type of VEP is the P300 potential. This potential is a positive peak in the EEG that occurs roughly 300 ms after the appearance of a target stimulus (a stimulus for which the user is waiting or seeking) or oddball stimuli. P300 amplitude decreases as the target stimuli and the ignored stimuli grow more similar. P300 is thought to be related to a higher level attention process or an orienting response. Using P300 requires fewer training sessions. The first application to use it was the P300 matrix. Within this system, a subject chooses a letter from a 6 by 6 grid of letters and numbers. The rows and columns of the grid flashed sequentially and every time the selected "choice letter" was illuminated the user's P300 was (potentially) elicited. However, the communication process, at approximately 17 characters per minute, was slow. P300 offers a discrete selection rather than continuous control. The advantage of P300 within games is that the player does not have to learn how to use a new control system, requiring only short training instances to learn gameplay mechanics and the basic BCI paradigm.

==== Non-brain-based human–computer interface (physiological computing) ====
Human-computer interaction can exploit other recording modalities, such as electrooculography and eye-tracking. These modalities do not record brain activity and therefore do not qualify as BCIs.

===== Electrooculography (EOG) =====
In 1989, a study reported control of a mobile robot by eye movement using electrooculography signals. A mobile robot was driven to a goal point using five EOG commands, interpreted as forward, backward, left, right, and stop.

===== Pupil-size oscillation =====
A 2016 article described a new non-EEG-based HCI that required no visual fixation, or ability to move the eyes. The interface is based on covert interest; directing attention to a chosen letter on a virtual keyboard, without the need to look directly at the letter. Each letter has its own (background) circle which micro-oscillates in brightness differently from the others. Letter selection is based on best fit between unintentional pupil-size oscillation and the background circle's brightness oscillation pattern. Accuracy is additionally improved by the user's mental rehearsal of the words 'bright' and 'dark' in synchrony with the brightness transitions of the letter's circle.

=== Brain-to-brain communication ===
In the 1960s, a researcher after training used EEG to create Morse code using alpha waves. On 27 February 2013, Miguel Nicolelis's group at Duke University and IINN-ELS connected the brains of two rats, allowing them to share information, in the first-ever direct brain-to-brain interface.

Gerwin Schalk reported that ECoG signals can discriminate vowels and consonants embedded in spoken and imagined words, shedding light on the mechanisms associated with their production and could provide a basis for brain-based communication using imagined speech.

In 2002, Kevin Warwick had an array of 100 electrodes fired into his nervous system in order to link his nervous system to the Internet. Warwick carried out a series of experiments. Electrodes were implanted into his wife's nervous system, allowing them to conduct the first direct electronic communication experiment between the nervous systems of two humans.

Other researchers achieved brain-to-brain communication between participants at a distance using non-invasive technology attached to the participants' scalps. The words were encoded in binary streams by the cognitive motor input of the person sending the information. Pseudo-random bits of the information carried encoded words "hola" ("hi" in Spanish) and "ciao" ("goodbye" in Italian) and were transmitted mind-to-mind.

== Cell-culture BCIs ==
The world's first neurochip, developed by Caltech researchers Jerome Pine and Michael Maher

Researchers have built devices to interface with neural cells and entire neural networks in vitro. Experiments on cultured neural tissue focused on building problem-solving networks, constructing basic computers and manipulating robotic devices. Research into techniques for stimulating and recording individual neurons grown on semiconductor chips is neuroelectronics or neurochips.

Development of the first neurochip was claimed by a Caltech team led by Jerome Pine and Michael Maher in 1997. The Caltech chip had room for 16 neurons.

In 2003 a team led by Theodore Berger, at the University of Southern California, worked on a neurochip designed to function as an artificial or prosthetic hippocampus. The neurochip was designed for rat brains. The hippocampus was chosen because it is thought to be the most structured and most studied part of the brain. Its function is to encode experiences for storage as long-term memories elsewhere in the brain.

In 2004 Thomas DeMarse at the University of Florida used a culture of 25,000 neurons taken from a rat's brain to fly a F-22 fighter jet aircraft simulator. After collection, the cortical neurons were cultured in a petri dish and reconnected themselves to form a living neural network. The cells were arranged over a grid of 60 electrodes and used to control the pitch and yaw functions of the simulator. The study's focus was on understanding how the human brain performs and learns computational tasks at a cellular level.

== Ethical considerations ==
Concerns center on the safety and long-term effects on users. These include obtaining informed consent from individuals with communication difficulties, the impact on patients' and families' quality of life, health-related side effects, misuse of therapeutic applications, safety risks, and the non-reversible nature of some BCI-induced changes. Additionally, questions arise about access to maintenance, repair, and spare parts, particularly in the event of a company's bankruptcy.

The legal and social aspects of BCIs complicate mainstream adoption. Concerns include issues of accountability and responsibility, such as claims that BCI influence overrides free will and control over actions, inaccurate translation of cognitive intentions, personality changes resulting from deep-brain stimulation, and the blurring of the line between human and machine. Other concerns involve the use of BCIs in advanced interrogation techniques, unauthorized access ("brain hacking"), social stratification through selective enhancement, privacy issues related to mind-reading, tracking and "tagging" systems, and the potential for mind, movement, and emotion control.

In their current form, most BCIs are more akin to corrective therapies that engage few of such ethical issues. Bioethics is well-equipped to address the challenges posed by BCI technologies, with Clausen suggesting in 2009 that "BCIs pose ethical challenges, but these are conceptually similar to those that bioethicists have addressed for other realms of therapy." Haselager and colleagues highlighted the importance of managing expectations and value.

The evolution of BCIs mirrors that of pharmaceutical science, which began as a means to address impairments and now enhances focus and reduces the need for sleep. As BCIs progress from therapies to enhancements, the BCI community is working to create consensus on ethical guidelines for research, development, and dissemination.

A 2026 review highlighted opportunities to strengthen protections for implantable BCI data through more robust approaches to de-identification, greater individual control, clearer separation of consent to implantation from consent to data use, stronger safeguards governing secondary uses, and more explicit frameworks for ownership and commercialization.

In August 2026, unifying standards for informed consent in implantable brain–computer interfaces were proposed, addressing challenges including communication impairment and assessment of decision-making capacity, surrogate consent, disclosure of procedural and device-related risks, management of user expectations, long-term responsibilities to users, and consent for neural data collection and use.

== Low-cost systems ==
Various companies are developing inexpensive BCIs for research and entertainment. Toys such as the NeuroSky and Mattel MindFlex have seen some commercial success.

- In 2006, Sony patented a neural interface system allowing radio waves to affect signals in the neural cortex.
- In 2007, NeuroSky released the first affordable consumer based EEG along with the game NeuroBoy. It was the first large scale EEG device to use dry sensor technology.
- In 2008, OCZ Technology developed a device for use in video games relying primarily on electromyography.
- In 2008, Final Fantasy developer Square Enix announced that it was partnering with NeuroSky to create Judecca, a game.
- In 2009, Mattel partnered with NeuroSky to release Mindflex, a game that used an EEG to steer a ball through an obstacle course. It was by far the best selling consumer based EEG at the time.
- In 2009, Uncle Milton Industries partnered with NeuroSky to release the Star Wars Force Trainer, a game designed to create the illusion of possessing the Force.
- In 2009, Emotiv released the EPOC, a 14 channel EEG device that can read 4 mental states, 13 conscious states, facial expressions, and head movements. The EPOC was the first commercial BCI to use dry sensor technology, which can be dampened with a saline solution for a better connection.
- In November 2011, Time magazine selected "necomimi" produced by Neurowear as one of the year's best inventions.
- In 2013, g.tec introduced the Unicorn Hybrid Black, a low-cost, portable EEG system designed for research, education, and BCI prototyping. The device combines dry and gel-based electrodes to reduce setup complexity while maintaining signal quality suitable for real-time applications.
- In February 2014, They Shall Walk (a nonprofit organization fixed on constructing exoskeletons, dubbed LIFESUITs, for paraplegics and quadriplegics) began a partnership with James W. Shakarji on the development of a wireless BCI.
- In 2016, a group of hobbyists developed an open-source BCI board that sends neural signals to the audio jack of a smartphone, dropping the cost of entry-level BCI to £20. Basic diagnostic software is available for Android devices, as well as a text entry app for Unity.
- In 2020, NextMind released a dev kit including an EEG headset with dry electrodes at $399. The device can run various visual-BCI demonstration applications or developers can create their own. It was later acquired by Snap Inc. in 2022.
- In 2023, PiEEG released a shield that allows converting a single-board computer Raspberry Pi to a brain–computer interface for $350.
- In 2025, Cerelog released the ESP-EEG, an open-source 8-channel BCI board based on the ESP32 microcontroller. With a launch price of $299, it utilizes the ADS1299 24-bit ADC, the same data acquisition ADC used in the OpenBCI Cyton, to offer research-grade biosensing at a lower cost. The device supports standard platforms like BrainFlow and Lab Streaming Layer (LSL), and is compatible with a modified version of the OpenBCI GUI.
- In 2025, g.tec introduced the Unicorn BCI Core-8, a compact, modular 8-channel EEG core aimed at low-cost research and embedded BCI applications. The system supports both human and animal EEG research and is designed for flexible integration into custom hardware and experimental setups.

== Future directions ==
A consortium of 12 European partners completed a roadmap to support the European Commission in their funding decisions for the Horizon 2020 framework program. The project was funded by the European Commission. It started in November 2013 and published a roadmap in April 2015. A 2015 publication describes this project, as well as the Brain–Computer Interface Society. It reviewed work within this project that further defined BCIs and applications, explored recent trends, discussed ethical issues, and evaluated directions for new BCIs.

Other recent publications too have explored future BCI directions for new groups of disabled users.

=== Disorders of consciousness (DOC) ===
Some people have a disorder of consciousness (DOC). This state is defined to include people in a coma and those in a vegetative state (VS) or minimally conscious state (MCS). BCI research seeks to address DOC. A key initial goal is to identify patients who can perform basic cognitive tasks, which would change their diagnosis, and allow them to make important decisions (such as whether to seek therapy, where to live, and their views on end-of-life decisions regarding them). Patients incorrectly diagnosed may die as a result of end-of-life decisions made by others. The prospect of using BCI to communicate with such patients is a tantalizing prospect.

Many such patients cannot use BCIs based on vision. Hence, tools must rely on auditory and/or vibrotactile stimuli. Patients may wear headphones and/or vibrotactile stimulators placed on responsive body parts. Another challenge is that patients may be able to communicate only at unpredictable intervals. Home devices can allow communications when the patient is ready.

Automated tools can ask questions that patients can easily answer, such as "Is your father named George?" or "Were you born in the USA?" Automated instructions inform patients how to convey yes or no, for example by focusing their attention on stimuli on the right vs. left wrist. This focused attention produces reliable changes in EEG patterns that can help determine whether the patient is able to communicate.

=== Motor recovery ===
People may lose some of their ability to move due to many causes, such as stroke or injury. Research in recent years has demonstrated the utility of EEG-based BCI systems in aiding motor recovery and neurorehabilitation in patients who have had a stroke. Several groups have explored systems and methods for motor recovery that include BCIs. In this approach, a BCI measures motor activity while the patient imagines or attempts movements as directed by a therapist. The BCI may provide two benefits: (1) if the BCI indicates that a patient is not imagining a movement correctly (non-compliance), then the BCI could inform the patient and therapist; and (2) rewarding feedback such as functional stimulation or the movement of a virtual avatar also depends on the patient's correct movement imagery.

So far, BCIs for motor recovery have relied on the EEG to measure the patient's motor imagery. However, studies have also used fMRI to study different changes in the brain as persons undergo BCI-based stroke rehab training. Imaging studies combined with EEG-based BCI systems hold promise for investigating neuroplasticity during motor recovery post-stroke. Future systems might include the fMRI and other measures for real-time control, such as functional near-infrared, probably in tandem with EEGs. Non-invasive brain stimulation has also been explored in combination with BCIs for motor recovery. In 2016, scientists out of the University of Melbourne published preclinical proof-of-concept data related to a potential brain–computer interface technology platform being developed for patients with paralysis to facilitate control of external devices such as robotic limbs, computers and exoskeletons by translating brain activity.

=== Functional brain mapping ===
In 2014, some 400,000 people underwent brain mapping during neurosurgery. This procedure is often required for people who do not respond to medication. During this procedure, electrodes are placed on the brain to precisely identify the locations of structures and functional areas. Patients may be awake during neurosurgery and asked to perform tasks, such as moving fingers or repeating words. This is necessary so that surgeons can remove the desired tissue while sparing other regions. Removing too much brain tissue can cause permanent damage, while removing too little can mandate additional neurosurgery.

Researchers explored ways to improve neurosurgical mapping. This work focuses largely on high gamma activity, which is difficult to detect non-invasively. Results improved methods for identifying key functional areas.

=== Flexible devices ===
Flexible electronics are polymers or other flexible materials (e.g. silk, pentacene, PDMS, Parylene, polyimide) printed with circuitry; the flexibility allows the electronics to bend. The fabrication techniques used to create these devices resembles those used to create integrated circuits and microelectromechanical systems (MEMS).

Flexible neural interfaces may minimize brain tissue trauma related to mechanical mismatch between electrode and tissue.

=== Neural dust ===
Neural dust is millimeter-sized devices operated as wirelessly powered nerve sensors that were proposed in a 2011 paper from the University of California, Berkeley Wireless Research Center. In one model, local field potentials could be distinguished from action potential "spikes", which would offer greatly diversified data vs conventional techniques.

== See also ==
- AlterEgo, a system that reads unspoken verbalizations and responds with bone-conduction headphones
- Augmented learning
- BrainCo
- Brain in a vat
- Cortical implants
- Deep brain stimulation
- Electroencephalography
- Experience machine
- Intendix
- Kernel (neurotechnology company)
- Motor imagery
- Neural engineering
- Neurorobotics
- Neurostimulation
- Nootropic
- OpenBCI
- Paradromics
- Precision Neuroscience
- Project Cyborg
- Simulated reality
- Stent-electrode recording array
- Thought identification
- Wetware computer (Uses similar technology for IO)
- Whole brain emulation
- Wirehead (science fiction)
