= This Place =

This Place may refer to:

- This Place (art project), a global art project that explores the complexity of Israel and the West Bank
- This Place (agency), a user experience agency based in London, Seattle and Tokyo
- "This Place", a song by Joni Mitchell from her 2007 album Shine
- This Place (film), a Canadian film
