= Richard Ramchurn =

Richard Ramchurn is a Scottish artist and film director. He directed, wrote and produced a pair of films with relatively new technology that allows audiences to portray films by control from the brain. This is done under his production and research company AlbinoMosquito that uses neuroscience through a NeuroSky headset to allow brain control over the movie. His films include The Disadvantages of Time Travel (2015) and The Moment (2018), along with credit from The Sentinel.

He graduated in Illustration and Animation from Manchester Metropolitan University in 2000, and from 2002 began to work on art, eventually leading to visual skills in theatre and film that have been broadcast on BBC News along with being shown worldwide.
