= Intendix =

intendiX (now known as Unicorn) is an EEG headset designed for use as a brain-computer interface (BCI). It was made available in 2009 by Guger Technologies, stylised as g.tec. It has been used for art pieces, to control components of a smart home, and as assistive technology.

== Description ==
intendiX can rely on P300 waves p and SSVEP.

In a P300 BCI, different items on the monitor (such as letters) flash while the user is instructed to silently count each time a target item flashes. The BCI can identify the target item by determining which flashes elicited brain signals. BCIs that use steady state visual evoked potentials (SSVEPs) instead rely on items that flicker instead of flash. The user focuses on one of the flickering items, producing SSVEP activity at the same frequency as that item. Therefore, a BCI can determine the target item by identifying the peak frequencies in the user's visual areas, which can only correspond to one of the many items on the monitor.

== intendiX components ==
The intendiX system requires four components:

- sensors that detect brain activity;
- signal processing algorithms that identify relevant brain signals in real time;
- a device or application where the output signal is sent; and an
- operating environment that connects these components to each other and mediate interaction with the user. (Wolpaw et al., 2002; Allison et al., 2007, 2012; Wolpaw and Wolpaw, 2012).

Sensors: The first intendiX system, released in 2009, allowed users to work with either passive or active electrodes. While both of these electrodes require electrode gel, like conventional electrodes, the active electrodes do not require skin preparation and are more robust to external noise. This is because active electrodes feature amplifiers and other electronics within each electrode, whereas passive electrodes first send brain signals along cables before amplification. In 2010, g.tec introduced the Sahara dry electrode, which does not require gel.

Signal processing: In typical BCIs, signal processing often involves different stages. For example, spatial filtering algorithms will determine how to best utilize information from the different electrodes, and pattern classification may categorize the resulting data. The intendiX system uses different signal processing algorithms for different types of brain signals.

With P300 signals, intendiX relies on stepwise linear discriminant analysis (SWLDA), The more general approach, LDA, is used in other types of BCIs as well. With SSVEP activity, intendiX instead relies on bandpower at different frequencies. A simple SSVEP BCI might present two stimuli on a monitor; the left stimulus oscillates at 8 Hz and the right at 13 Hz. If the user's visual areas show an increase at 8 Hz and its harmonics, a signal processing algorithm can identify this spike and thus infer that the user is focusing on the left stimulus.

Device/Application: Initially, intendiX was used to control a speller. Using the extendiX system, users can also control any smart home device such as a television, music player, air conditioner, or light. extendiX can control other devices as well, such as mobile robots or games. extendiX receives commands from intendiX via UDP and could thereby control any external device. In March 2012, g.tec presented the pre-release of their new Screen Overlay Control Interface (SOCI) at the CeBIT exposition in Hannover, Germany. Visitors to the g.tec booth could use the intendiX system to play World of Warcraft and Angry Birds, and additional game interfaces are being developed. The SOCI will be publicly available later in 2012.

Operating Environment: The intendiX system interacts with users in different ways, depending on whether it is a P300 or SSVEP BCI. Both approaches require paying attention to different regions of the monitor to produce distinct brain signals that the BCI can recognize. intendiX also includes software to determine when users are not paying attention based on their EEG signals. This way, the system can easily enter a "sleep" mode without any instruction from the user, and return to an active state when the user again begins paying attention to the activity on the monitor.

== See also ==
- Brain–computer interface
