= Neural Impulse Actuator =

Brain–computer interface (BCI) device

The Neural Impulse Actuator (NIA) is a brain–computer interface (BCI) device developed by OCZ Technology. BCI devices attempt to move away from the classic input devices like keyboard and mouse and instead read electrical activity from the head, preferably the EEG. The name Neural Impulse Actuator implies that the signals originate from some neuronal activity; however, what is actually captured is a mixture of muscle, skin and nerve activity including sympathetic and parasympathetic components that have to be summarized as biopotentials rather than pure neural signals. As of May 27, 2011, the OCZ website says that the NIA is no longer being manufactured and has been end-of-lifed.

On June 1, 2012 a post was made on the official forums, asking about the NIAs future, the reply being, "It [the NIA] was spun out into a different company as a side-effect of OCZ's IPO and that company is BCInet."

== Name ==
The name Neural Impulse Actuator is still justifiable since also the secondary signals are under neuronal control. The biopotentials are decompiled into different frequency spectra to allow the separation into different groups of electrical signals. Individual signals that are isolated comprise alpha and beta brain waves, electromyograms and electro oculograms. The current version of the NIA uses carbon-fibers injected into soft plastic as substrate for the headband and for the sensors and achieves sensitivity much greater than the original silver chloride-based sensors using a clip-on interface to the wire harness.

== Shortkeys system ==
Control over the computer in either desktop or gaming environments is done by binding keys to different zones within as many as three vertical joysticks. Each joystick can be divided into several zones based on thresholds and each zone within each joystick can be bound to a keyboard key. Each keystroke can further be assigned to several modes, including single keystroke, hold, repeat and dwell, which allows full plasticity with respect to configuration of the NIA for any application. Moreover, the same "vertical joysticks" can be used in more than one instance to enable simultaneous pressing of multiple keys at any given time like "W" and "Spacebar" for jumping forward or toggling between left and right strafing for running in a zigzag pattern.

== Software support ==
The only software available officially is proprietary to 32 and 64-bit versions of Microsoft Windows 7 (XP and Vista).

No specifications have been published. People who are trying to make use of the device on Unix-like platforms, or create their own software for it for other reasons, say it may be a HID device providing raw data from its sensors to the software. There is no support for Linux.

The 3rd-party input remapping applications GlovePIE and PPJoy accept input from the nia according to GlovePIE.org forums.

== See also ==
- Comparison of consumer brain-computer interface devices
- Emotiv EPOC
- Mindset
