= Neurowear =

Human augmentation project

Neurowear is a gadget project organization in Japan founded on the concept of the "Augmented Human Body". The group's first project, known as Necomimi (from nekomimi (猫耳; "cat ear(s)")) is a headband with a brain wave sensor and motorized cat shaped ears programmed to turn up or down based on the wearer's electroencephalogram (electrical potentials recorded at the scalp) influenced by "thoughts and emotions". neurowear collaborated with Qosmo and Daito Manabe on "unboxxx" exhibition in July 2012 at Gallery KATA Ebisu.

== Necomimi ==
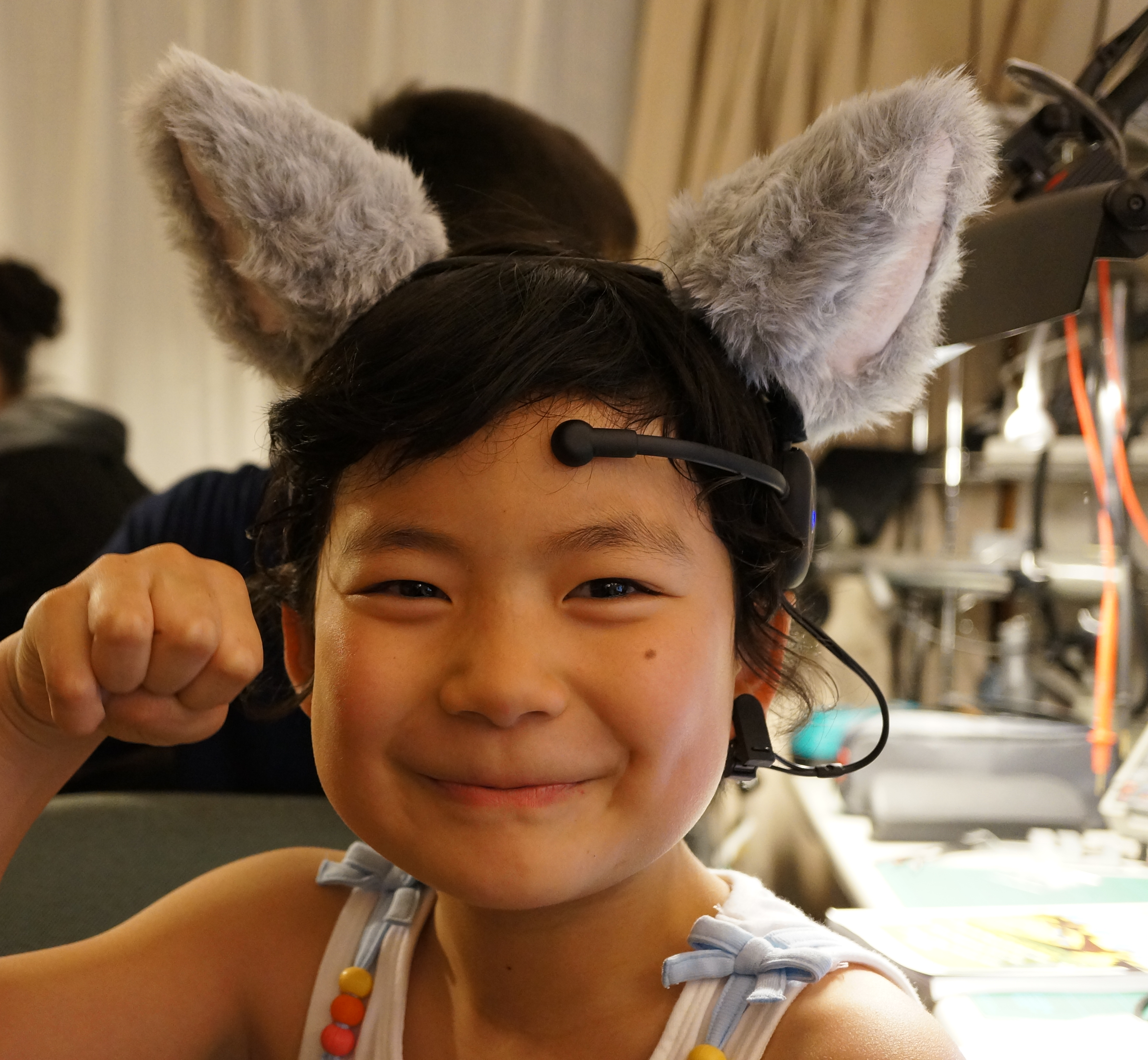
Boy wearing Necomimi cat ears

Necomimi is a headband with a MindWave brain wave sensor manufactured by NeuroSky and motorized cat shaped ears programmed to turn up when the wearer concentrates and to turn down when they relax. It runs for 4 hours on 4 AAA batteries and has interchangeable Cat, Dog, and Devil Horn ears. In November 2011, Time Magazine selected necomimi as one of the 50 best inventions of the year. Necomimi received an Honorary Mention in the Interactive Art category of 2013 Prix Ars Electronica.

NeuroSky rejected neurowear's partnership proposal, but neurowear went ahead with the May 2011 announcement that necomimi would be released internationally by the end of 2011 "at a price of several hundred dollars." The viral popularity of the simulated promotional video brought NeuroSky back to the table.

Necomimi was demoed at Gadget Show Live in April 2012. necomimi was launched in Japan at the Nico Nico Cho-Kaigi at Makuhari Messe in Chiba City on April 28, 2012. Ayaka Komatsu modeled the ears on April 29, 2012. The US price is $99.95. necomimi was sold at Japan Expo in July 2012 for €150.

While there are few official ear options available, individual crafters create a variety of ear covers, including bear, fox, wolf, bunny ears, and commissioned pieces with a variety of colors. Many of these are sold at conventions, through Etsy, and other online websites.

Limited edition necomimi were created to promote The Wolf Children Ame and Yuki. The ears' color matches the titular wolf children. Another limited edition was created by Nobuki Hizume and modeled by Nagisa. Anderson Cooper has a Yoda pair. A Green Bay Packers fan replaced the ears with cheese wedges.

Necomimi premiered in the U.S. at FanimeCon in May 2012, and launched in the U.S. at San Diego Comic-Con in July 2012. Christina Bonnington reviewed the headband for Wired. Andrew Tarantola reviewed it for Gizmodo. Betsy Isaacson reviewed it for The Huffington Post.

== Brain Disco ==
Brain Disco is a collaboration between neurowear and Qosmo that measures audience "attention." The DJ must hold the audience's "attention" or get ejected. The first Brain Disco experiment was held in July 2012 at Gallery KATA Ebisu.

== Shippo ==
Neurowear demonstrated their new prototype Shippo ("tail") at the Tokyo Game Show in September 2012. Shippo was developed with Kiluck Inc. Kiluck failed to fund a similar tail "Tailly" on Kickstarter but is trying again on Indiegogo. The tail wags like a dog based on the user's mood communicated from the headset wirelessly via Bluetooth. neurowear also showed an iPhone app that uploads the user's mood to social media complete with geotagging.

== Neuro Turntable ==
Neurowear presented Neuro Turntable at ROKURO Music×Interactive×Party Volume.2 at SuperDeluxe in Roppongi on December 1, 2012. Neuro Turntable is a device that reads brainwaves and plays music only when the wearer is focused on the music. The music stops as soon as the wearer stops concentrating on it, but it starts again as soon as they gain attention.

== Mico ==
Neurowear introduced mico "music inspiration from your subconsciousness" at SXSW Trade Show in March 2013. They are headphones that pick music based on brain waves.

== See also ==
- Brain-computer interface
