= NeuroSky =

Brain-computer interface technology manufacturer

NeuroSky, Inc.
- Company type: Private
- Founded: 2004; 22 years ago, in San Jose, California
- No. of locations: 5
- Area served: Worldwide
- Founders: Stanley Yang; JongJin Lim; KooHyoung Lee
- Key people: Stanley Yang (CEO); Jake Chuang
- Website: www.neurosky.com
- Current status: Active

NeuroSky, Inc. is a manufacturer of brain-computer interface (BCI) technologies for consumer product applications, which was founded in 2004 in Silicon Valley, California. The company adapts electroencephalography (EEG) and electromyography (EMG) technology to fit a consumer market within a number of fields such as entertainment (toys and games), education, automotive, and health.

NeuroSky technology allows for low-cost EEG-linked research and products by using inexpensive dry sensors; older EEGs require the application of a conductive gel between the sensors and the head. The systems also include built-in electrical "noise" reduction software/hardware, and utilize embedded (chip level) solutions for signal processing and output.

Neurosky primarily works as an original equipment manufacturer, or OEM, collaborating with industry partners, developers, and research institutions to deploy the technology into their own products and systems. When NeuroSky has released direct-to-consumer products, such as the MindSet and the MindWave, they are typically designed for maximum flexibility of use through third party and open-source content.

== Company timeline ==
1999: The work behind NeuroSky technology began.

2004: NeuroSky inc. was incorporated in Silicon Valley.

2006: Received early first funding from angel investors.

2007: First round of Venture funding from San Francisco-based WR Hambrecht + Co., Japan-based Marubeni Corp. and Taiwan-based TUVC. So far, the company says it has received nearly $19 million in backing from investors.

2009: Mattel launches the Mindflex toy.

2009: Uncle Milton launches the Star Wars Force Trainer.

2009: NeuroSky launches the MindSet, research and developer multimedia headset and free SDK/developer tools.

2009: In NeuroSky's first two years it raised 6.8 million.

2010: The company has raised 11.8 million in its third round of venture funding.

2011: NeuroSky launches the MindWave, a headset catering directly to the consumer market.

2011: Neurowear demonstrates necomimi, a headband with motorized cat ears based on a MindWave headset.

== Technical background ==
Diagram of a basic NeuroSky headset.

The human brain is made up of billions of interconnected neurons; the patterns of interaction between these neurons are represented as thoughts and emotional states. Every interaction between neurons creates a minuscule electrical discharge; alone these charges are impossible to measure from outside the skull. However, the activity created by hundreds of thousands concurrent discharges aggregates into waves which can be measured.

Different brain states are the result of different patterns of neural interaction. These patterns lead to waves characterized by different amplitudes and frequencies; for example waves between 12 and 30 hertz, Beta Waves, are associated with concentration while waves between 8 and 12 hertz, Alpha Waves, are associated with relaxation and a state of mental calm. The contraction of muscles is also associated with unique wave patterns, isolating these patterns is how some NeuroSky devices detect blinks.

All electrical activity produces these waves, including light bulbs, thus all electrical devices create some level of ambient "noise"; this "noise" interferes with the waves emanating from the brain, this is why most EEG devices will pick up readings even if they are not on a person's head. Measuring mental activity through these waves is like trying to eavesdrop on a conversation at a loud concert. In the past, EEG devices circumvented this problem by measuring these signals in environments where electrical activity is strictly controlled and increasing the signal strength of the data coming from the brain through the application of a conductive solution.

Raw Brainwaves and Power Spectrum

However, most people don't have rooms in their house devoid of electronic devices nor do they want to apply a conductive liquid to their head every time they use a BCI device. NeuroSky has developed complex algorithms built into their products which filter out this "noise". NeuroSky's white paper claims the ThinkGear technology has been tested at 96% as accurate as that within research grade EEGs.

NeuroSky is also selling non-contact sensors to research institutions. These are dry electrodes that can measure brainwaves millimeters from the scalp and thus can easily be worn over hair. These sensors are a significant technological breakthrough in that they are the only non-contact EEG sensors ever developed.

== Neurosky partnerships ==
While NeuroSky produces its own direct to consumer products, it is primarily a chip developer and manufacturer. NeuroSky assists other companies in incorporating BCI technology into their products and supplies them with the specialized hardware required to do so. Because of this, who NeuroSky partners with and has partnered with shapes the public's adoption of BCI technology.

US Archery team: The first use of NeuroSky's technology was by the USA Olympic Archery team to improve their game. The coaches and archers testimony to the effectiveness of NeuroSky technology as a training tool played a large part in spurring the future development of early NeuroSky tech. It was found that elite archers had a state of both mental calm and concentration when they released while mid-level archers lacked a state of mental calm yet had a high concentration. This finding allowed coaches like Kisik Lee, Guy Krueger, and Mel Nichols to train mid-level archers to reach that mind state (of being able to concentrate on what they need to do while staying relaxed). NeuroSky has hinted on numerous occasions that it is either producing or interested in producing publicly available products that allow one to train in a similar way for other sports, with golf mentioned specifically.

Toshiba:

Square Enix: In 2008 it announced that it was working on Judecca, a game with NeuroSky.

InteraXon: InteraXon develops custom software to be used with Neurosky's hardware specializing in large publicity events like the Olympic light show. InteraXon's CEO Ariel Garten stated: "The NeuroSky technology has expanded the possibilities for our company we are taking thought controlled computing to the next level and in the case of the Bright Ideas display, to a massive scale. The NeuroSky MindSet provided us with reliable, low cost, and easy to use headset that allowed us to focus on what we think is really important – creating compelling user experiences that allow people to use this technology in new and exciting ways." – Neurosky's CEO, Stanley Yang stated: "InteraXon is able to take what was once limited to only an exciting idea, and make it into a reality – they possess a unique and creative vision for thought-controlled technology. It is exciting for us to see a partner like InteraXon take the MindSet and develop it into applications that are well designed, easy to use and compelling to engage with," says NeuroSky.

Uncle Milton Industries: Uncle Milton is a leading manufacturer of science and nature exploration toys most famous for the "Ant Farm". On 07/13/2009 Uncle Milton Industries and NeuroSky Inc. announced an exclusive partnership to develop science toys and games utilizing NeuroSky's technology. The first of these toys was the Star Wars Force Trainer released during the Christmas season of 2009.

Mattel inc.: On 04/28/2009 Mattel Inc. formed an exclusive multi-year partnership with NeuroSky Inc. The first product, the Mindflex, was released for the 2009 Christmas season.

Sega Toys: Talks began in early 2007 and an official announcement was made on 10/10/2008.

Musinaut: Musinaut is a Paris-based music company that plans to use the device to create interactive music technology that controls a user's music based on their thoughts and moods.

Titan Commerce: In 3/9/2010 NeuroSky announced an agreement (signed 03/12/2010) with Titan Commerce for distribution and support operations of the NeuroSky MindSet and ThinkGear technology components to the EU.

Mind Games: MindGames is an Iceland-based developer of games that utilize EEG technology. MindGames is known for Tug of Mind, a game set to be released for future NeuroSky products. MindGames' long-term goal is to develop games that teach people how to control negative emotions. However, it is not clear whether or not MindGames simply produces games for NeuroSky products or whether they have an official partnership.

Universities and Research Institutions: Because NeuroSky also produces research grade EEG technology it has partnerships with a number of universities and research intuitions including: Johns Hopkins, Brown University, Duke University, University of California San Diego, San Jose State University, Dongguk University, University of Glasgow, The Hong Kong PolyTechnic University, and Trinity College, Dublin.

== NeuroSky products ==
MindWave: The MindWave is a NeuroSky product released in 2010 in China and 2011 in the US and the EU. It costs $99 US making it one of the least expensive EEG device to ever be produced. The MindWave has been marketed as both an education and entertainment device. The MindWave won the Guinness Book of World Records award for "Heaviest machine moved using a brain control interface".

Research Products: Neurosky has produced a number of research products (generally very similar to their direct to consumer products ). These products have been widely adopted due to positive reviews by early adopters with Richard Reilly Ph.D., professor at Trinity College in Dublin stating that, "We have been impressed with the quality of data from the MindKit Pro, compared to our gold-standard EEG acquisitions system. It has opened new possibilities for the remote monitoring patients' activity a great benefit in patient care."

Modules: TGAM, ThinkGear Asic Module, hardware module for decoding brain waves.

Mind Kit & Mind Set: The Mind Set (referred to as the Mind Kit in early press releases) was NeuroSky's first direct to consumer product. With a number of prototypes sold in 2007. The Mind Set was the first direct to consumer BCI product under $1000 ever made. The MindSet consisted of headphones with three sensors on one ear piece and another on a flexible arm coming off of the headphones that sat on the forehead. The headphones had a wireless Bluetooth connection and came with a small Bluetooth dongle. The first non-prototype models were sold for $199.

Non-Contact Sensors: NeuroSky is currently selling a Non-Contact system to research institutions. This system is based on seven dry electrodes that can measure brainwaves millimeters from the scalp and thus can easily be worn over hair. These sensors are a significant technological breakthrough in that they are the only non-contact EEG sensors ever developed. These sensors have been effectively used with SSEVP (steady-state visually evoked potential) allowing a device incorporating them to tell which object, out of a set group of objects, the wearer is looking at. NeuroSky has not released any consumer products using these sensors nor has it announced that it is intending to.

Pre MindKit: In early press releases at least four different pre-MindKit devices can be seen, none of these were sold to the public and none of the articles mention names for the models.

== Products produced in conjunction with NeuroSky using NeuroSky technology ==
Mindflex: The MindFlex was produced in conjunction with Mattel and released for the 2009 Christmas season. It is a game in which players lift a ball by concentrating and move it through a maze. The concentration levels are measured by a headset using NeuroSky technology which wirelessly interfaces with a platform that floats the ball through the use of a fan which was moved around the course in a circle by a dial; (this platform was based on a previous Mattel toy, the "Harry Potter Sorcerer's Stone Electronic Levitating Challenge Board Game").The MindFlex allowed the player to modify the course by sticking plastic obstacles in peg holes at different locations and was preprogrammed with 5 games as well as multiplayer options. Mattel sold out its entire stock five weeks after launch.

Star Wars Force Trainer: The Star Wars Force Trainer was produced in conjunction with Uncle Milton inc. and released for the 2009 Christmas season (it was released for pre-sale midnight July 23, 2009). It is a game in which players lift a ball by concentrating. The ball is levitated by a fan and concentration is measured using NeuroSky technology. The ball is designed to look like the ball Luke trained with to learn how to control the Force in the first Star Wars.

MindRDR: MindRDR is a Google Glass application created by This Place that connects a Neurosky MindWave sensor to Google Glass to allow concentration and relaxation outputs from the biosensor to take and share photos on Twitter and Facebook without physical or verbal interaction. MindRDR was released in July 2014.

== See also ==
- Brain-Computer Interface
- Electroencephalography
- Mindflex
- Force Trainer
- Comparison of consumer brain-computer interface devices
- Emotiv EPOC
- Neural Impulse Actuator
