= Eric Leuthardt =

American neurosurgeon

Eric C. Leuthardt
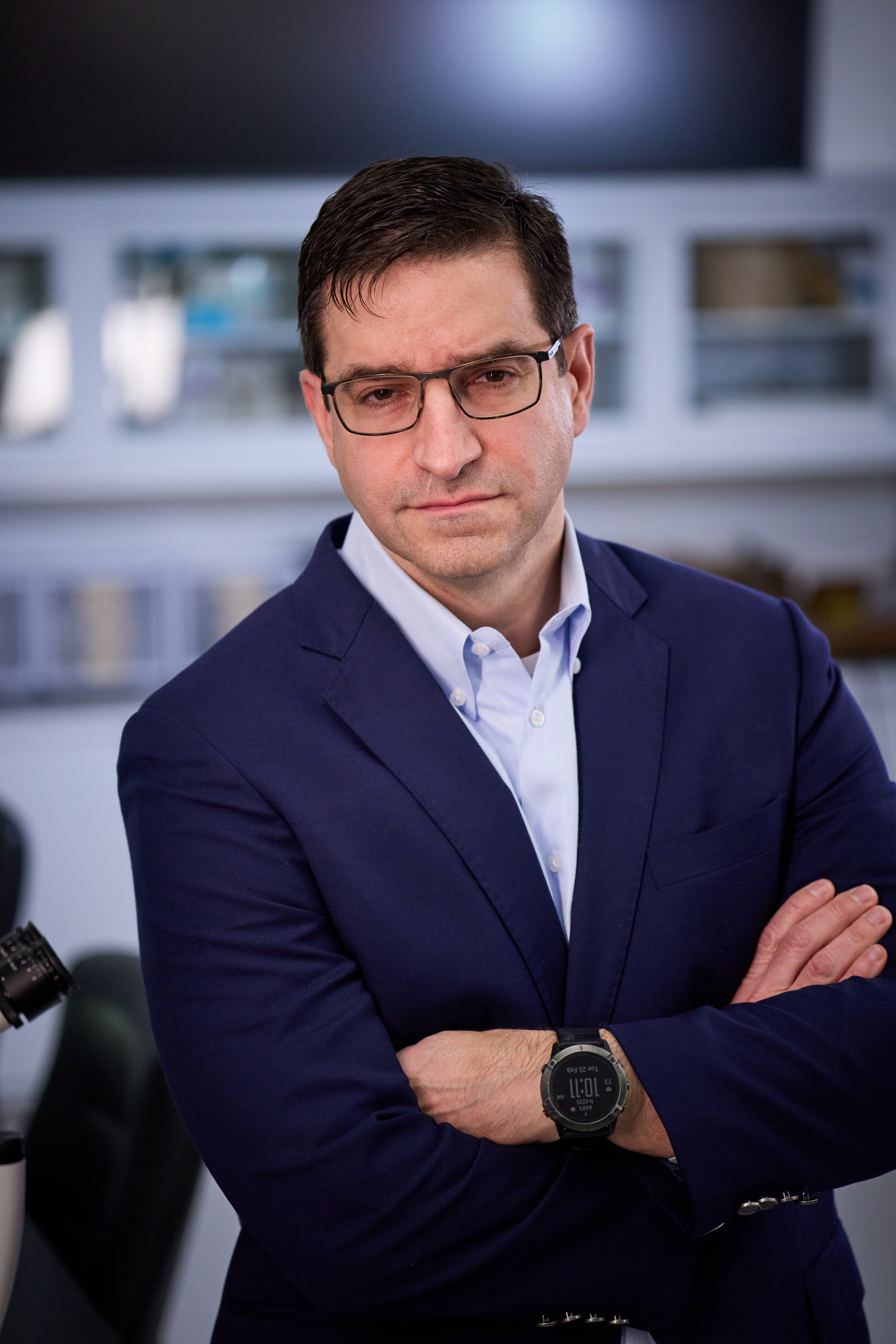
- Eric C. Leuthardt in 2025
- Born: 1973 (age 52–53); Boston, Massachusetts, U.S.
- Education: Saint Louis University (B.S.); University of Pennsylvania (M.D.); Washington University in St. Louis (Executive M.B.A., 2024)
- Known for: Brain-computer interfaces Neuroprosthetics; IpsiHand system
- Awards: Fellow, National Academy of Inventors (2018); Fellow, American Institute for Medical and Biological Engineering (2025); MIT Technology Review TR100 (2004)
- Scientific career
- Fields: Neurosurgery; Neurotechnology; Biomedical engineering
- Workplaces: Washington University in St. Louis

Eric C. Leuthardt (born 1973) is an American neurosurgeon, neuroscientist, inventor, and author. He is the Shi H. Huang Professor of Neurological Surgery at Washington University in St. Louis, where he serves as vice-chair of innovation in the Department of Neurosurgery, chief of the Division of Neurotechnology, and director of the Center for Innovation in Neuroscience and Technology.

He is recognized for pioneering human electrocorticographic (ECoG) brain-computer interfaces (BCI) and co-developing the IpsiHand system, one of the first FDA-cleared non-invasive BCIs for chronic stroke rehabilitation.

== Early life and education ==
Leuthardt was born in 1973 in Boston, Massachusetts, to a German father who worked in the auto industry and an Italian mother who was a teacher. He spent part of his early childhood in Stuttgart, Germany, before being raised primarily in Cincinnati, Ohio.

He received a B.S. in biology and theology from Saint Louis University and an M.D. from the University of Pennsylvania School of Medicine. He completed his neurosurgery residency at Washington University in St. Louis and Barnes-Jewish Hospital and earned an Executive M.B.A. from the Olin Business School at Washington University in St. Louis in 2024.

== Career ==
Leuthardt joined the Washington University in St. Louis faculty in 2006. He holds professorships in neurological surgery, neuroscience, biomedical engineering, and mechanical engineering & materials science. His clinical practice focuses on brain tumors, epilepsy surgery, laser interstitial thermal therapy, and Gamma Knife radiosurgery at Barnes-Jewish Hospital and St. Louis Children’s Hospital.

== Research and inventions ==
In 2004, Leuthardt and colleagues published the first demonstration of a human ECoG-based brain-computer interface that allowed a paralyzed teenager to control a video game using only thought.

His laboratory develops neurotechnologies for motor restoration after stroke, speech decoding, and advanced brain mapping. He co-developed the IpsiHand system through Neurolutions, which received FDA De Novo authorization in 2021 for chronic stroke rehabilitation.

A 2025 peer-reviewed study and preliminary results from a 2026 randomized controlled trial (presented at the International Stroke Conference) demonstrated functional improvements in patients using the device; full peer-reviewed publication of the latest trial is anticipated.

Leuthardt is a inventor with over 600 U.S. patents granted and more than 1,000 pending on neurotechnology devices and medical instruments.

== Entrepreneurship ==
Leuthardt has co-founded multiple startups to translate his research into clinical tools. In 2025, AI-based resting-state fMRI brain mapping software called Cirrus, developed in his lab, received FDA market authorization through Sora Neuroscience, a Washington University in St. Louis startup he co-founded. Described as a potential "sea change for clinical imaging," it enables faster, more accessible functional brain insights for neurosurgery and neurological diseases.

He serves as CEO of Aurenar, developing a single-use, wearable transcutaneous auricular vagus nerve stimulation device for ICU patients to modulate inflammation non-invasively and potentially reduce life-threatening complications.

== Creative works ==
Leuthardt has written two techno-thriller novels, RedDevil 4 (2014) and Limbo (2017), which explore the ethical implications of neurotechnology. He has stated that fiction allows him to examine the broader societal consequences of the brain technologies he develops. He also co-created the Regional Emmy Award-winning (Mid-America Chapter) PBS special BrainWorks.

== Awards and honors ==
- Daniel P. Schuster Award for Distinguished Work in Clinical and Translational Science (2020)

== Societies ==
- Fellow, National Academy of Inventors (2018)
- Fellow, American Institute for Medical and Biological Engineering (2025)

== Selected publications ==
- Leuthardt, Eric C.; Schalk, Gerwin; Wolpaw, Jonathan R.; Ojemann, Jeffrey G.; Moran, Daniel W. (June 2004). "A brain-computer interface using electrocorticographic signals in humans". Journal of Neural Engineering. 1 (2): 63–71. doi:10.1088/1741-2560/1/2/001. PMID 15876624.
- Schalk, Gerwin; Kubánek, Jan; Miller, Kai J.; Anderson, Nicholas R.; Leuthardt, Eric C.; Ojemann, Jeffrey G.; Olson, John D.; Wise, Steven P.; Wolpaw, Jonathan R. (September 2007). "Decoding two-dimensional movement trajectories using electrocorticographic signals in humans". Journal of Neural Engineering. 4 (3): 264–275. doi:10.1088/1741-2560/4/3/012. PMID 17873429.
