= MindRDR =

Google Glass app

MindRDR is a Google Glass app created by This Place, a London, Seattle and Tokyo based user experience agency. MindRDR connects a Neurosky MindWave Mobile portable EEG monitor to Google Glass and uses the EEG signal to control functionality on Google Glass.

The MindRDR app can use the EEG signals to take a photo using the Google Glass camera, and then can share the picture to Twitter or Facebook. The MindWave EEG sensor measures brainwaves and the MindRDR app interprets these brain waves as an input signal for activation of hardware on Google Glass; with high levels of concentration being used as a positive user gesture, and relaxation as a negative user gesture.

== User interface ==
Within the app, users are presented with a live feed if the viewfinder with a graphical overlay - a vertical line with a scale at the side and options to exit the app or take a photo at the top and bottom. The vertical line moves up and down the screen dependent on the signal from the EEG monitor, with higher levels of brain waves associated with concentration moving the bar towards the top, and higher levels of brain waves associated with relaxation moving the bar towards the bottom. Once concentration levels get high enough, the camera captures a picture and the image remains on screen with the bar moving to allow the user to share to Twitter with a positive response, or discard the photo with a negative response.

== Possible uses ==
The creators of MindRDR suggest that this tool could be used to help people with severe physical disabilities, such as locked-in syndrome and quadriplegia interact with the digital world, however there has been no research published as yet to show its efficacy.
