= Mindflex =

Toy by Mattel

Mindflex is a toy by Mattel by which, according to its description, the operator uses their brain waves to steer a ball through an obstacle course. Brain waves are registered by the enclosed EEG headset, which allows the user to control an air stream by concentrating, thus lifting or lowering a foam ball that is trapped in the airflow due to the Coandă effect. The game was released in the fall of 2009, and uses the same microchip as the MindSet from NeuroSky and homebuilt EEG machines.

== Controversy ==
Despite the science behind the technology developed by Mattel, outside scientists have questioned whether the toy actually measures brain waves or just randomly moves the ball, exploiting the well-known illusion of control. However, despite the John-Dylan Haynes experiments, supporters of the game stand behind the research that went into the development of Mindflex, and believe that the headset does indeed read EEGs.

== See also ==
- Consumer brain–computer interfaces
- Brain-Computer Interface
