= Paradromics =

American medical device company

Paradromics Inc.
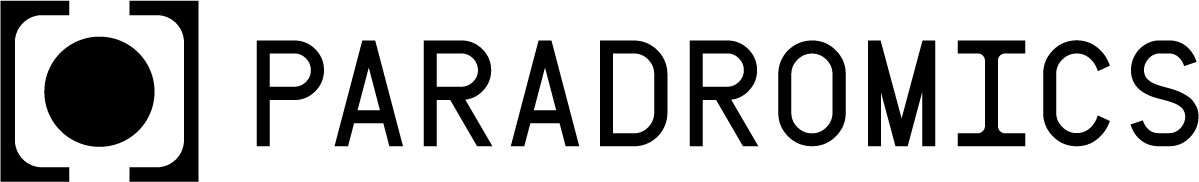
- Company type: Private
- Industry: Neurotechnology
- Founder: Matt Angle
- Headquarters: Austin, Texas, United States
- Website: www.paradromics.com

Paradromics Inc. is an American brain–computer interface (BCI) company headquartered in Austin, Texas with a second office located in Oakland, California.

== Overview ==
The company is building a high data-rate brain-computer interface. The interface consists of a fully implantable system that collects neural data and transfers that data wirelessly through the skin to an external system, which in turn translates the data into the user's intended speech or computer inputs in real time. Seamless data and power transfer are supported by a secure near-infrared optical data link and inductive power coupling. Paradromics aims to treat severely motor-impaired people with irreversibly debilitating conditions like spinal cord injury, stroke, and neurodegenerative diseases such as ALS.

== History ==
Paradromics was founded in 2015 by CEO Matt Angle to translate neural recording technology from the lab at Stanford University to a fully-implantable, wireless form factor for use as a commercial medical device. Within its first two years, Paradromics secured a NIH SBIR and a DARPA contract, collectively worth US$15 million. This early validation enabled the development of its core technology and the raise of venture funds in 2018.

In late 2019, Paradromics transformed from a technology-focused company that was developing core capabilities to a product-focused company that was building a marketable medical device, the Connexus Brain-Computer Interface (BCI).

In 2021, Paradromics was awarded a $3.2 million Phase II SBIR grant from the NIH to develop high-density intracortical microelectrode arrays for clinical applications. This grant included collaboration with Massachusetts General Hospital's Center for Neurotechnology and Neurorecovery, highlighting Paradromics' commitment to advancing clinical research and applications of its technology.

In 2023, the company raised a US$33 million venture round led by Prime Movers Lab with participation from Westcott Investment Group, Dolby Family Ventures, and Green Sands Equity. The Connexus BCI was granted its first Breakthrough Device Designation by the U.S. Food and Drug Administration (FDA), which provides an expedited review process for transformative medical devices with the potential to treat irreversibly debilitating conditions. The first application of the Connexus BCI is an assistive communication device that translates brain signals into speech and movement in real time, restoring social connection and enabling independent engagement with technology.

In 2024, The Connexus BCI was granted a second Breakthrough Device Designation that will enable individuals with severe motor deficits treated with the Connexus BCI to control computer devices. Paradromics was also accepted into the U.S. FDA's newest program for innovative devices, the TAP (Total Product Life Cycle Advisory Program) Pilot. The FDA states that this program is intended to "help spur more rapid development and more rapid and widespread patient access to safe, effective, high-quality medical devices of public health importance".

== Technology ==
The company is building a brain–computer interface capable of recording from single neurons. The interface, called the Connexus BCI, consists of the Cortical Module, Internal Transceiver, and a connecting lead. The Cortical Module is surgically placed by a neurosurgeon onto the surface of the brain located in the motor cortex. The system utilizes a surgical technique similar to that of DBS. The Cortical Module consists of a 421-channel microwire electrode array, with 421 electrodes approximately 1.55 mm long (0.06 inches) that extend just below the brain's surface to directly gather neural signals. The microelectrodes are thinner than a strand of human hair (<40 μm electrode diameter). The system supports up to four Cortical Modules, totalling up to 1684 intracortical electrodes.

This data passes from the Cortical Module to the Internal Transceiver along a thin, flexible lead. It is then wirelessly transmitted from the Internal Transceiver to a wearable External Transceiver via a secure infrared data link that supports 100 Mbit/s. The system is continuously powered via inductive coupling. This continuous stream of data then passes to a small computational unit that applies AI, machine learning, and advanced language models for real-time interpretation of the user's intended speech or computer inputs.

Altogether, the system will work by reading a patient's brain signals to interpret their intended speech.

== Testing ==
Preclinical testing of Paradromics' Connexus Brain-Computer Interface has demonstrated a bit rate exceeding 200 bps with a system latency of 56 ms. In November 2025, the company received FDA Investigational Device Exemption (IDE) approval for first-in-human clinical trials.
