= Edward Chang (neurosurgeon) =

American neurosurgeon

- Born: Edward F. Chang
- Education: University of California, San Francisco
- Known for: Neurosurgery
- Awards: Gruber Prize in Neuroscience 2025; NIH Director's New Innovator Award 2011
- Scientific career
- Fields: Neuroscience
- Workplaces: Department of Neurological Surgery at the University of California, San Francisco

Edward Chang is an American neurosurgeon and scientist. He is the Joan and Sandy Weill Chair of the Department of Neurological Surgery at the University of California, San Francisco and Jeanne Robertson Distinguished Professor.

Chang specializes in operative brain mapping to ensure the safety and effectiveness of surgery for treating seizures and brain tumors, as well as micro-neurosurgery for treating cranial nerve disorders such as trigeminal neuralgia and hemifacial spasm. In 2020, Chang was elected into the National Academy of Medicine for "deciphering the functional blueprint of speech in the human cerebral cortex, pioneering advanced clinical methods for human brain mapping and spearheading novel translational neuroprosthetic technology for paralyzed patients."

== Academic career ==
Chang attended Amherst College, where he majored in neuroscience. He then attended medical school at UCSF, where he also did a predoctoral fellowship on auditory cortex neurophysiology with Professor Michael Merzenich. He later did his neurosurgery residency at UCSF and trained under the mentorship of Dr. Mitchel Berger for brain tumors, Dr. Nicholas Barbaro for epilepsy, and Dr. Michael Lawton for vascular disorders. During residency, he did postdoctoral fellowship on human cognitive neuroscience with Dr. Robert Knight at UC Berkeley.

Chang joined the UCSF neurosurgery faculty in 2010 and was promoted to department chair in 2020.

== Scientific contributions ==
Chang has made fundamental contributions to understanding the neural code of speech and neuropsychiatric conditions in the human brain.

Chang pioneered the use of high-density direct electrophysiological recordings from cortex, which enabled him and colleagues to determine the selective tuning of cortical neurons to specific acoustic and phonetic features in consonants and vowels. His lab discovered the neural coding of vocal pitch cues in prosodic intonation for English and lexical tones in Mandarin. Chang's lab determined how the auditory cortex detects temporal landmarks such as onsets and acoustic edges in the speech envelope signal to extract syllables and stress patterns, important for the rhythm and intelligibility of speech.

A general finding in his work is that the internal phonological representation of speech sounds results from complex auditory computations in the STG; including processes such as adaptation, contrast enhancement, normalization, complex spectral integration, non-linear processing, prediction and temporal dynamics.

His lab demonstrated that the superior temporal lobe is critical for conscious speech perception. That is, it is not only integral for detecting speech sounds but also interpreting them. For example, they showed how the superior temporal cortex can selectively attend to one voice when multiple voices are present and how it restores missing sounds to words when a phoneme segment is replaced with noise.

To address information flow in auditory speech processing, Chang and his colleagues demonstrated that the primary auditory cortex may not be a critical input to phonological processing in the STG. They showed that both primary and non-primary STG areas are activated in parallel, and that interruption of the primary auditory cortex through electrical stimulation and ablation does not have significant consequences on auditory word recognition. Conversely, interruption of the left STG does impair auditory word recognition. Instead of serial feedforward processing in the classic ventral stream model, they propose an alternative model where inputs may be thalamic in origin, auditory word processing is mediated by recurrent processing in the STG, and that word representations emerge from the time-dependent population dynamics of STG neurons.

Chang's lab also studies the basis of speech production, the neurobiological mechanisms that govern how we speak. He and his colleagues have mapped out how different locations of the sensorimotor cortex control specific movements of the vocal tract, including the lips, jaw, tongue and larynx. With cortical recordings and electrical stimulation mapping, Chang demonstrated the existence of dual laryngeal motor representations on each hemisphere. This finding revised the long-held "homunculus" functional organization of human motor cortex. The dorsal laryngeal cortex is a region that is responsible for controlling the intonational pitch of one's voice when speaking, and when stimulated, can evoke vocalization. It has been proposed that this area may have been critical to the evolution of speech in humans.

Chang has proposed that the middle precentral gyrus is an important area for speech planning for articulation, a function that has been traditionally attributed to Broca's area in the posterior inferior frontal gyrus. This novel brain area overlaps with the dorsal larynx cortex, and has unique integrative functions including auditory processing and reading and spelling. He demonstrated that surgical resection of a tumor in the left precentral gyrus can result in apraxia of speech, a condition where articulatory speech fluency is affected, despite normal language functions and intact orofacial motor strength. In contrast, resections in Broca's area can cause word finding difficulties, but rarely result in dysfluency of Broca's aphasia.

Chang's team applied their discoveries on speech control to develop new neuroprosthetic technology designed to restore communication to patients who have lost the ability to speak. In 2019, they demonstrated that is possible to synthesize intelligible speech sentences from cortical recordings of brain activity. In 2021, as part of the BRAVO clinical trial, the team demonstrated the first successful decoding of full words and sentences from the brain activity of a man who was severely paralyzed after brainstem stroke and could not speak for over 15 years. They subsequently expanded this approach to demonstrate the first successful speech synthesis and control over a digital facial avatar, as well as large-vocabulary, high-performance text decoding.

Chang has also done research to understand and treat neuropsychiatric conditions such as depression and chronic pain. From 2014-2019, Chang led a multi-institutional project in the US BRAIN Initiative, which focused on developing new medical device technology to treat severe refractory neuropsychiatric conditions. He and colleagues developed new methods to record and precisely stimulate focal brain regions to alleviate depression and anxiety, as well as methods to detect and monitor depression symptoms from brain activity.

In 2021, as part of a FDA approved clinical trial, they demonstrated the first successful application of closed-loop deep brain stimulation for the treatment of depression, in which focal precise stimulation is applied episodically when brain recordings detected depression states. In 2023, Prasad Shirvalkar, a pain neurologist at UCSF, and Chang demonstrated the direct brain activity patterns that predict chronic pain.

== Awards ==
2025	Gruber Prize in Neuroscience	Gruber Foundation
2023	Winn Prize	Society of Neurological Surgeons
2022	Pradel Award	National Academy of Sciences
2020	National Academy of Medicine	National Academies
2018	Bowes Biomedical Investigator	William K Bowes Foundation
2015	Blavatnik National Laureate in Life Sciences	The Blavatnik Family Foundation
2015	Robertson Investigator	New York Stem Cell Foundation
2014	McKnight Memory and Cognitive Disorders Award	The McKnight Endowment Fund for Neuroscience
2011	NIH Director's New Innovator Award (DP2)	National Institutes of Health (NIH)
2011	Klingenstein Fellowship Award in the Neurosciences, Ebert Scholar	The Ester A. and Joseph Klingenstein Foundation
2009	Pathway to Independence Award	K99/R00 NIH NINDS
2009	Ronald Bittner Award	American Association of Neurological Surgeons
2008	Wilder Penfield Fellowship	Congress of Neurological Surgeons (CNS)
