= Force Trainer =

Star Wars-themed toy

The Force Trainer is a Star Wars-themed toy which creates the illusion of performing Force-powered telekinesis.

The brain–computer interface toy, released was Uncle Milton Industries' Star Wars Science line in 2009, comes with a headset that claims to sense the brain's electric fields (similar to an EEG) and relays the signals to a tube that uses a fan to blow a ball into the air. The harder the user concentrates, the harder the fan blows, and the higher the ball is suspended. The voice of Yoda instructs the user on developing their skills.

In a 2010 episode of the College Humor series Bleep Bloop, the hosts Jeff Rubin and Pat Cassels tested out the toy, even having a co-worker, Brian Murphy, play Brain Age, a video game advertised as making you use your brain more, while he had the Force Trainer headset on.

One user of the toy argues that the brainwave effect of the Force Trainer II is fake; if the electrodes are connected directly to each other instead of being worn by the player, the game will proceed to play itself and pass all of the training exercises without any user input.

== See also ==
- Comparison of consumer brain–computer interface devices
