= Steady state visually evoked potential =

Brain responses phase-locked to periodic visual stimulation

In neurology and neuroscience research, the steady-state visually evoked potential (SSVEP) is an electrophysiological response that is phase-locked to a periodic visual stimulus. When the retina is excited by a visual stimulus at a constant rate—typically in the range of ~3.5–75 Hz—the brain generates oscillatory activity at the same frequency and its harmonics (and, in multi-frequency paradigms, at intermodulation frequencies). SSVEPs are most commonly measured with electroencephalography (EEG), owing to their high signal-to-noise ratio and robust frequency specificity.

== History ==
Early work on periodic photic stimulation established that steady-state responses could be elicited across a broad range of flicker frequencies, with prominent resonance peaks near the alpha and gamma bands. Methodological refinements—such as high-density EEG, digital displays with precise timing, and frequency-tagging of complex scenes—expanded applications in vision science and cognitive neuroscience.

== Physiological mechanisms ==
SSVEPs reflect the entrained activity of visual cortical populations. Their amplitudes and phases depend on stimulus frequency, contrast, and duty cycle, and often exhibit resonance-like enhancement around ~10, ~20, and ~40 Hz. In multi-frequency paradigms, nonlinear neural interactions give rise to harmonic and intermodulation components that are diagnostically useful for isolating specific computations and interactions between concurrently processed stimuli.

== Stimulation paradigms ==
Common paradigms include:

- Single-frequency flicker of a field, grating, or object.
- Dual- or multi-frequency tagging, where separate elements flicker at distinct rates to isolate responses to each item and their interactions.
- Rapid invisible frequency tagging near or below perceptual thresholds, which can minimize awareness while preserving tagging fidelity.
- Frequency-modulated SSVEP (FM-SSVEP), in which the instantaneous stimulation frequency varies within a band to probe dynamics and broaden spectral energy.

Stimulus parameters (luminance vs. chromatic modulation, contrast, duty cycle, phase, and spatial frequency) strongly influence response magnitude and topography.

== Recording and analysis ==
SSVEPs are typically strongest over occipital electrodes (e.g., Oz, O1/O2) but distributed responses are common for complex stimuli. Analysis is usually performed in the frequency domain using discrete Fourier transforms or multitaper spectra, with amplitude (or power), phase, and signal-to-noise metrics reported at the tagged frequencies, their harmonics, and intermodulation terms. Preprocessing may include re-referencing, artifact rejection, and independent component analyses. Modern pipelines also incorporate cross-trial coherence and regression-based spectral estimation to track attentional modulation and time-varying gain.

== Applications ==
=== Vision science ===
Frequency tagging has been used to quantify contrast response functions, surround suppression, binocular interaction, disparity processing, object and face categorization, and figure–ground segmentation. Tagging multiple scene elements allows selective readout of concurrent processes and their interactions.

=== Cognitive neuroscience ===
Attentional selection reliably modulates SSVEP amplitude and phase across spatial and feature-based attention tasks, including during competition and rivalry. Recent work extends tagging into near-threshold regimes and complex scenes to dissociate attention from awareness.

=== Clinical and translational research ===
SSVEPs have been explored in aging, neurodegenerative disease, amblyopia, migraine, and photosensitivity, offering objective markers of visual pathway integrity and cortical excitability. During sleep, SSVEP power and frequency tuning are attenuated, reflecting state-dependent changes in thalamo-cortical processing.

=== Brain–computer interfaces (BCIs) ===
SSVEPs support high information transfer rates with minimal training, motivating speller and control interfaces using code-modulated (c-), frequency-modulated (f-), and joint frequency–phase coding. Contemporary approaches use filter-bank canonical correlation analysis and deep learning to improve robustness across users and recording conditions. Public benchmark datasets increasingly include multi-frequency and dual-frequency paradigms to assess generalization.

== Safety and comfort ==
Because periodic flicker can provoke seizures in photosensitive individuals, experimenters should avoid high-contrast wide-field flicker in the most provocative range (~15–25 Hz) and adhere to published safety guidelines (e.g., limiting spatial extent, luminance contrast, and duty cycle; avoiding simultaneous red flashes; and respecting flash-rate constraints). Similar principles have been discussed for public displays and environments in which flicker may be unavoidable (e.g., wind-turbine shadow flicker).

== See also ==
- Evoked potential
- Brain–computer interface
