= Premovement neuronal activity =

Premovement neuronal activity in neurophysiological literature refers to neuronal modulations that alter the rate at which neurons fire before a subject produces movement. Through experimentation with multiple animals, predominantly monkeys, it has been shown that several regions of the brain are particularly active and involved in initiation and preparation of movement. Two specific membrane potentials, the bereitschaftspotential, or the BP, and contingent negative variation, or the CNV, play a pivotal role in premovement neuronal activity. Both have been shown to be directly involved in planning and initiating movement. Multiple factors are involved with premovement neuronal activity including motor preparation, inhibition of motor response, programming of the target of movement, closed-looped and open-looped tasks, instructed delay periods, short-lead and long-lead changes, and mirror motor neurons.

== Two types of movement ==
Research of pre-movement neuronal activity generally involves studying two different kinds of movement, movement in natural settings versus movement triggered by a sensory stimulus. These two types of movements are referred to with different nomenclature throughout different studies and literature on the topic of premovement neuronal activity. Voluntary movements are also known as self-timed, self-initiated, self-paced, and non-triggered movements. This type of movement is what generally occurs in natural settings, carried out independently of a sensory cue or external signal which would trigger or cause the movement to be performed. In contrast, movements that are carried out as a result of a sensory cue or stimulus, or reflex-reactions to external conditions or changes are called reactive movements, but also known as cued movements, stimulated movements, and externally triggered movements depending on the choice of a particular study. In one such study by Lee and Assad (2003), rhesus monkeys were trained to execute arm movement in response to a visual cue versus the same arm movement performed without any correlation to this external (visual) cue. This is one example of reactive movements in contrast to self-initiated movements. Subsequent studies of rates of neuronal firing in the respective types of movements are recorded in different areas of the brain in order to develop a more thorough understanding of premovement neuronal activity.

== Regions of the brain involved in pre-movement ==
=== Pre-frontal area ===
Functions in:

- Decision making
- Response selection with move
- Timing of movement
- Initiation/suppression of action

=== Pre-supplementary motor area (Pre-SMA) and the lateral pre-motor cortex ===
Functions in:

- Preparatory processes

=== Supplementary motor area (SMA) proper and the primary motor cortex (M1) ===
Functions in:

- Initiation of movement
- Execution of movement

== Bereitschaftspotential ==
In 1964, two movement related cortical potentials were discovered by Kornhuber and Deecke. Using both the electroencephalography (EEG) and the electromyogram (EMG) recordings, Kornhuber and Deecke were able to identify two components prior to movement onset. These components are the Bereitschaftspotential (abbreviated BP, and also known as readiness potential, abbreviated RP) and the Contingent Negative Variation (CNV). The difference between these two potentials is that the BP is involved in self-paced, or voluntary movements, whereas the CNV is involved with cued movements, movements performed as reactions to an environmental signal.

The Bereitschaftspotential is a movement related potential. The initiation of the BP occurs approximately 2 seconds prior to movement onset. The BP is an index of motor preparation and is therefore also referred to as the "readiness potential", as it is the potential for movement to occur. The initial stage of the BP, or readiness potential, is an unconscious intention of, and preparation for movement. After this initial stage, the preparation of movement becomes a conscious thought.

The BP, more specifically, is composed of movement related cortical potentials (MRCPs) the peak being the MP or Motor potential. MRCPs tend to resemble a "set of plans" used by the cortex for the generation and control of movement. The BP is activated by voluntary movements involving the SMA and the somatosensory cortex in movement preparation and initiation. Initially only the late BP was considered to be specific for the site of movement and the early BP was thought to be characterized by more general preparation for upcoming movements. However, over the past couple of decades the early BP is considered to perhaps also be site specific within the supplementary motor area (SMA) and the lateral premotor cortex. Using principal component analysis and functional magnetic resonance imaging (fMRI) the main source of early BP was determined to be Area 6 of the precentral gyrus bilaterally, and the main sources of late BP were determined to be Area 4 (also known as the Primary Motor Cortex) and Area 6. The current consensus is that the early BP starts first in the SMA, including pre-SMA and SMA proper, and then approximately 400ms later in the lateral premotor cortices bilaterally prior to the movement onset, and the late BP starts in the M1 and premotor cortex contralaterally.

The two factors that most greatly influence the BP are the effect of discreteness and complexity of movement. A study conducted in 1993 compared isolated extensions of the middle finger with simultaneous extensions of the middle and index fingers. The results showed that the isolated movement of the middle finger produced a larger amplitude in the late BP, but not the early BP. The amplitude difference in the late BP was seen over the central region contralateral to the movement, which suggests an important role of M1. Complex movements cause greater amplitudes of the BP, which reflects the fact that there is greater activation of the SMA. Further experiments also suggest that the bilateral sensorimotor cortices play a role in the preparation of complex movements, along with the SMA.

== Organization of primary motor cortex ==
Some of the first relevant experimentation and subsequent findings about the organization of the primary motor cortex were observed by Wilder Penfield. Penfield, a neurosurgeon in Montreal began his experimentation in the 1950s, to better serve his epileptic patients. Penfield understood that his epileptic patients experience a warning sign before the seizures occur. This knowledge started the beginning of his stimulation experimentations. Here, Penfield tried to induce this warning sign in an attempt to specifically pinpoint the source of epilepsy. Penfield confirmed the presence of a spatial map of the contralateral body of the brain. He noted the location of muscle contractions with the site of electro-stimulation on the surface of the motor cortex and subsequently mapped the motor representation of the pre-central gyrus. This follows the same trends and disproportions in the somatic sensory maps in the post central gyrus.

Experimentation via intra-cortical micro-stimulation brought about a more detailed understanding of motor maps. By injecting current via a sharpened tip of a microelectrode into the cortex, the upper motor neurons in layer 5, which project to lower motor neurons can be stimulated. These neurons are associated with the neurons in the spinal cord, and thus stimulating specific movements which occur in specified muscular regions rather than stimulating specific muscles which produce those movements. Neuron connections in the motor map are linked for the purpose of generating specific movements. These connections are not linked for the purpose of generating specific muscles movements or contractions.

Spike-triggered averaging is a way to measure the activity of one cortical motor neuron, on a group of lower motor neurons in the spinal cord. Experimentation confirmed that single upper motor neurons are connected to multiple lower motor neurons. This supports the general conclusion that movements and not individual muscles are controlled by the activity of upper motor neurons.

=== Rates of upper neuron firing change prior to movement ===
Individual motor neurons were recorded using implanted microelectrodes to record their activity in awake and behaving monkeys. This experimentation provided a way to figure out the correlation between neuronal activity and voluntary movement. It was found that the force generated by contracting muscles changed as a function of the firing rate of upper motor neurons. The firing rates of the active neurons often change prior to movements involving very small forces. This suggests that, the primary motor cortex contributes to the initial phase of the recruitment of lower motor neurons, involved in the generation of finely controlled movements.

== "Closed-loop" motor tasks vs. "open-loop" motor tasks ==
Approximately 65% of the neurons in the pre-motor cortex are responsible for conditional "closed-loop" motor tasks. In experimentation using monkeys, when they were trained to reach in different directions, depending on the specified visual cue, the approximately coordinated lateral pre-motor neurons began to fire at the appearance of that specified cue, but before the actual signal to perform the movement. As learning takes place, to associate a new visual cue with a particular movement, the approximately coordinated neurons increase their rate of fire during the time between the initial specified cue and the actual signal for the initiation of the movement. It now seems that these specific neurons do not command the initiation of the movements but the intention to perform the movements. Thus these pre-motor neurons are especially involved in the selection of movements based on external events.

More evidence that the lateral pre-motor area is involved in movement selection comes from observations of the effects of cortical damage on motor behavior. Lesions to this area severely impair the ability of monkeys to perform visually cued conditional tasks. Meaning that on command, it becomes extremely difficult for the monkey to perform the trained movement. But, when placed in another setting, the monkey is perfectly capable of performing that movement in a spontaneous, self initiated manner, as a response to the same visual stimulus.

The medial pre-motor cortex seems to be specialized for initiating movements specified by internal rather than external cues. These movements based on internal events are called "open-loop" conditions. In contrast to lesions in the lateral pre-motor area, removal of this medial pre-motor area reduces the number of self initiated or spontaneous movements that the animal makes. Conversely, the ability to move in response to an external cue is largely intact.

== Parietal area 5 ==
The parietal cortex plays a role in the internal command of actions. Most specifically, parietal area 5 is responsible for the actions which precede movement. Area 5 neurons exhibit pre-movement activity in response to self initiated movements. The neurons in area 5 play a role in the initiation and execution of movement and respond at enormously quick speeds. An EMG (electromyogram) is a test of electrical activity in muscles. The neurons in area 5 respond at least 100ms faster than EMG detectable activity allows. The cerebral cortex forms a series of loops with the basal ganglia and the cerebellum which drive the initiation of movements, via these positive feedback loops. The neurons on the parietal associative cortex are most strongly involved in programming and execution of voluntary movements.

A learned act is the movement which is produced when the starting sensory signal launches the programmed execution. This action requires the neurons of the parietal associative cortex. There are two phases of the readiness potential, the early phase and the late phase. The early phase is responsible for the "planning of programmed movements". The late phase is responsible for the "stimulation of the movement’s direct implementation." The early phase of the readiness potential occurs in the supplementary motor region and is involved in the generation of voluntary movement. The late phase of premovement occurs in the cortical regions and is involved in definite voluntary movements. The two formal stages of premovement are planning and initiation.

== Mirror motor neurons ==
Mirror motor neurons are found in the ventrolateral portion of the pre-motor cortex. These mirror motor neurons respond not only to the preparation for movement execution, but also to observation of the same movements by others. But, these mirror motor neurons do not respond as well when an action is being pantomimed without the presence of a motor goal. Additionally, in observations of goal oriented movements, these neurons fire even when the result is blocked from view. The mirror motor neuron system is responsible for encoding intention and relevant behaviors of others. Additionally, these neurons may play a role with the frontal and parietal lobes in imitation learning.

A study by Daniel Glaser involved dancers trained in ballet and those trained in capoeira (Brazilian martial art form). The dancers were shown a short video of both ballet and capoeira dance moves. The research indicated that the mirror motor neurons showed increased activity when the dancers watched the video for the style they have been trained in. Additionally, the control, non-dancers, showed significantly less brain activation in the mirror motor neurons when watching either type of dance.

This research provides insight into how the brain responds to movements you have personally learned to do. This may provide a way to allow professionals to maintain a skill without actually performing the movement. Or it may provide an outlet for mental rehabilitation to those with impaired motor skills. Simple observation of the movement allows the same type of brain stimulation as the actual physical movement.

== Preparatory changes in neuronal activity ==
Execution of certain motor tasks requires an instructed delay. This delay period occurs in between the instructed cue and the subsequently triggered movement. During these delay periods preparatory changes occur in neuronal activity. The primary motor cortex, the pre-motor cortex, the supplementary motor area, parietal cortex, and the basal ganglia all may experience these preparatory delay periods. These activities coordinate during the delay periods and reflect movement planning in accordance with the instructional cue and the subsequent movement but occur prior to muscle activity. The movement planning may be anything from the direction of the movement to the extent of the movement.

== Short lead changes vs. long lead changes ==
Premovement neuronal activity has been widely experimented upon in three major motor fields of the frontal cortex. The goal of this experimentation is to compare the neuronal activity which comes from visual signals, versus neuronal activity which comes from non-triggered or self-paced movements. From this comparison, two changes were identified, occurring at different time scales in relation to the onset of movement. These changes are the short lead and long lead changes. The short lead changes are observed about 480ms before the movement, whereas the long lead changes occur about 1–2 seconds earlier. The short lead changes are exhibited in the SMA (supplementary motor area) and the PM (pre-motor area) during both the visual signal trials and the non-triggered/self-paced trials. The pre-central motor cortex was also identified in this study as having similar neuronal activities as in the PM and SMA. Experimentation found that approximately 61% of the neurons in the PM were preferentially related to the triggered (visual) movements. The long lead neuronal changes were more frequently active during the self paced stimuli than before the triggered movements. These long lead changes are particularly abundant among the SMA neurons. In summation, these experiments challenged the idea that the SMA primarily takes part in self-paced movements and the PM is only involved in visually triggered movements. Although the PM neurons showed more preference for the visual trigger signals and the SMA neurons are intimately related to initiation of self paced movements, both are involved with premovement for both types of stimuli.

== Link between the cortex and basal ganglia ==
A subcortical loop exists within the brain linking upper motor neurons originating in the primary motor and pre-motor cortices and the brainstem, with the basal ganglia. These upper motor neurons eventually initiate movement by controlling the activity of lower motor neurons, located in the brainstem and spinal cord, and project out to innervate the muscles in the body. Upper motor neurons also modulate activity of local circuit neurons, whose synapses are a large input to these lower motor neurons, in turn affecting subsequent movement. Thus, the basal ganglia indirectly influence movement via regulation of the activity of the upper motor neurons, which ultimately determine activity of the lower motor neurons.

=== Areas of basal ganglia affect movement ===
The basal ganglia include groups of motor nuclei located deep within the cerebral hemispheres, including the corpus striatum, which contains two nuclei named the caudate and putamen, and also the pallidum, which contains the globus pallidus and substantia nigra pars reticulate. The corpus striatum is the main input center of the basal ganglia, specifically upper neurons of motor areas in the frontal lobe that control eye movement link to neurons in the caudate, while upper neurons from pre-motor and motor cortices in the frontal lobe connect to neurons in the putamen. The main neurons found within these structures are named medium spiny neurons.

==== Activation of medium spiny neurons ====
The activation of medium spiny neurons is generally associated with the occurrence of a movement. Extracellular recording have shown that these specific neurons increase their rate of discharge before an impending movement. Such anticipatory discharges seem to be involved in a movement selection process, can precede a movement by several seconds, and vary according to location in space of the destination of the movement.

==== Processing movement signals by the basal ganglia ====
The neurons present in the global pallidus and substantia nigra are the main output areas of the basal ganglia. These efferent neurons influence activity of the upper motor neurons. Neurons in these areas are GABAergic, and thus the main output of the basal ganglia is inhibitory, and spontaneous activation of these neurons consistently prevents unwanted movement. The input of medium spiny neurons to these output areas of the basal ganglia are also GABAergic and therefore inhibitory. The net effect of excitatory inputs to the basal ganglia from the cortex is inhibition (via the medium spiny neurons) of the persistently active inhibitory cells in the output center of the basal ganglia. This double inhibitory effect leads to activation of upper motor neurons, which causes subsequent signaling of local-circuit and lower motor neurons to initiate movement. This pathway is defined as the direct pathway through the basal ganglia. There is another indirect pathway present between the corpus striatum and part of the globus pallidus. This indirect pathway also involves the subthalamic nucleus (a part of the thalamus), which receives signals from the cerebral cortex. Excitatory signals from the cortex will activate subthalamic neurons, which are excitatory also. Thus, this indirect pathway serves to reinforce inhibition by excitatory signals to the GABAergic cells present in the globus pallidus. In effect, this pathway regulates the direct pathway by feeding back onto the output centers of the basal ganglia. The balance between these two pathways processes movement signals and influences the initiation of an impending movement.

== Movement Disorders and Future Research ==
The bereitschaftspotential has also been found to be influenced by movement disorders such as Parkinson's disease (PD), cerebellar lesions, and degenerative diseases of the dentate nucleus. Since at least some part of the BP originates from the SMA, "which receives main dopaminergic input from the basal ganglia via thalamus", many are conducting studies of BP in patients with Parkinson's disease (PD). It has also been found that people with cerebellar lesions have clear abnormalities in their BP. In patients with degenerative diseases of dentate nucleus there is virtually a complete lack of BP. In patients with cerebellar hemispheric lesions the BP is much smaller again or even absent.

Of all the movement disorders studied, Parkinson's is by far the most investigated. Most experiments have studied the effects of lesions on the BP in patients with Parkinson's disease. It was observed that the amplitude of BP in many Parkinson's patients was significantly reduced. A BP with a more positive polarity was observed compared to the BP in control patients without the disease. Other research shows the same reduction in amplitude of movement-related cortical potentials, which is consistent with other studies showing a decrease in the activation of the SMA in Parkinson's patients. A decreased ability to terminate premovement preparatory activity has been observed in Parkinson's patients, reflected by prolonged activity in the SMA . This prolonged activity may have to do with impaired function of the basal ganglia, which is thought to send a termination signal to the SMA. While changes in preparatory movement activity are present in PD patients, executed-movement processes in the brain seem to be unaffected, suggesting that premovement activity abnormality may underlie the difficulty in movement prevalent in Parkinson's disease. More research studying the effects of the disease on MRCPs (like the BP) and premovement preparatory activity in PD patients is ongoing.
