= This Place (agency) =

- Company type: Subsidiary
- Industry: User Experience
- Founded: 2013; London, United Kingdom
- Founders: Dusan Hamlin; Ben Aldred; Chloe Kirton
- Area served: Worldwide
- Number of employees: 30+
- Parent: Asteria Corporation (formerly Infoteria Corporation)
- Website: www.thisplace.com

This Place are a digital strategy and design agency, designing sustainable digital businesses that work for customers, for shareholders and for society. They design websites, apps and digital services used by millions of people. Working with clients across the globe from a London hub, they are part agency, part consultancy and true partner

This Place was set up by Dusan Hamlin, Ben Aldred and Chloe Kirton in 2013 based on the premise that user experience and design would be increasingly important for businesses to succeed in the future.

== MindRDR ==
This Place is known for creating the open source project MindRDR, a Google Glass and EEG device based remote control interface. MindRDR connects Google Glass with a device to monitor brain activity, allowing users to take pictures and socialise them on Twitter or Facebook.

The BBC has worked with This Place to further develop the MindRDR.

== Acquisition ==
In April 2017, This Place was acquired by Infoteria, a publicly listed Japanese digital product development company.

== Blockchain ==
The This Place team has previously participated and won Blockchain related hackathons. They invested in unlocking the potential of Blockchain for the masses using user experience and design.
