= Nobuki Hizume =

Japanese milliner

- 日爪 ノブキ（ひづめのぶき）
- Born: June 24, 1979 (age 47)
- Education: Bunka Fashion College
- Honours: Meilleur Ouvrier de France
- Website: http://nobukihizume.com http://hizume.com

Nobuki Hizume (日爪 ノブキ, Hizumi Nobuki; born 24 June 1979) is a Japanese milliner.

== Life and career ==
After graduating from Bunka Fashion College, Hizume moved to Italy and announced a brand as an underwear designer. After returning to Japan, he began his brand NOBUKI HIZUME for hats and headpieces and presented his collections.

In 2009, he moved to Paris. In 2019, he received the title of Meilleur Ouvrier de France.
