= Cortical implant =

Subset of neuroprosthetics

A cortical implant is a subset of neuroprosthetics that is in direct connection with the cerebral cortex of the brain. By directly interfacing with different regions of the cortex, the cortical implant can provide stimulation to an immediate area and provide different benefits, depending on its design and placement. A typical cortical implant is an implantable microelectrode array, which is a small device through which a neural signal can be received or transmitted.

The goal of a cortical implant and neuroprosthetic in general is "to replace neural circuitry in the brain that no longer functions appropriately."

== Overview ==
Cortical implants have a wide variety of potential uses, ranging from restoring vision to blind patients or helping patients with dementia. With the complexity of the brain, the possibilities for these brain implants to expand their usefulness are nearly endless. Some early work in cortical implants involved stimulation of the visual cortex, using implants made from silicone rubber. Since then, implants have developed into more complex devices using new polymers, such as polyimide. There are two ways that cortical implants can interface with the brain, either intracortically (direct) or epicortically (indirect). Intracortical implants have electrodes that penetrate into the brain, while epicortical implants have electrodes that stimulate along the surface. Epicortical implants mainly record field potentials around them and are generally more flexible compared to their intracortical counterparts. Since the intracortical implants go deeper into the brain, they require a stiffer electrode. However, due to micromotion in the brain, some flexibility is necessary in order to prevent injury to the brain tissue.

=== Visual implants ===
Certain types of cortical implants can partially restore vision by directly stimulating the visual cortex. Early work to restore vision through cortical stimulation began in 1970 with the work of Brindley and Dobelle. With their initial experimentation, some patients were able to recognize small images at fairly close distances. Their initial implant was based on the surface of the visual cortex and it did not provide as clear of images that it could, with an added downside of damage to surrounding tissues. More recent models, such as the "Utah" Electrode Array use deeper cortical stimulation that would hypothetically provide higher resolution images with less power needed, thus causing less damage. One of the major benefits to this method of artificial vision over any other visual prosthetic is that it bypasses many neurons of the visual pathway that could be damaged, potentially restoring vision to a greater number of blind patients.

However, there are some issues that come with direct stimulation of the visual cortex. As with all implants, the impact of their presence over extended periods of time must be monitored. If an implant needs to be removed or re-positioned after a few years, complications can occur. The visual cortex is much more complex and difficult to deal with than the other areas where artificial vision are possible, such as the retina or optic nerve. The visual field is much easier to process in different locations other than the visual cortex. In addition, each areas of the cortex is specialized to deal with different aspects of vision, so simple direct stimulation will not provide complete images to patients. Lastly, surgical operations dealing with brain implants are extremely high-risk for patients, so the research needs to be further improved. However, cortical visual prostheses are important to people who have a completely damaged retina, optic nerve or lateral geniculate body, as they are one of the only ways they would be able to have their vision restored, so further developments will need to be sought out.

Advancements in visual implants focus on stimulating specific areas of the visual cortex. The middle temporal (MT) region, crucial for perceiving motion, is a key target for electrical stimulation to create smooth motion artificially. Precise electrode implantation in MT poses a challenge due to its location, which is surrounded by sulci. Ongoing research explores multi-area stimulation between MT and primary visual cortex (V1), aiming to understand its impact on generating phosphenes (visual illusion) and motion perception. This multi-area approach, targeting different regions in the visual system, holds promise for improving the clarity and performance of visual implants, offering a potential avenue for more effective vision restoration.

=== Auditory implants ===
While there has been little development in developing an effective auditory prosthesis that directly interfaces with the auditory cortex, there are some devices, such as a cochlear implant, and an auditory brainstem implant, introduced by Dr. William House and his team, that have been successful in restoring hearing to deaf patients. The cochlear implant targets the cochlear or auditory nerve, and individuals who have issues with this nerve can never benefit from it. As an alternative, the auditory brainstem prosthesis can be used.

There have also been some studies that have used microelectrode arrays to take readings from the auditory cortex of animals. One study has been performed on rats to develop an implant that enabled simultaneous readings from both the auditory cortex and the thalamus. The readings from this new microelectrode array were similar in clarity to other readily available devices that did not provide the same simultaneous readings. With studies like this, advancements can be made that could lead to new auditory prostheses.

To address the challenges faced by conventional auditory prostheses, many unconventional auditory prostheses, such as bone conduction implants and middle ear implants are still under ongoing research. The bone conduction prosthesis stimulates the cochlea by triggering skull vibrations. The middle ear prosthesis, either partially or completely implanted, triggers direct vibration of the ossicular chain (ossicles or ear bones). Despite the complications these prostheses may cause, their purpose is to enhance the transmission of sound vibrations into the inner ear and, consequently, improve hearing abilities.

=== Cognitive implants ===
Some cortical implants have been designed to improve cognitive function. These implants are placed in the prefrontal cortex or the hippocampus. Implants in the prefrontal cortex help restore attention, decision-making and movement selection by duplicating the minicolumnar organization of neural firings. A hippocampal prosthetic aims to help with restoration of a patient's full long-term memory capabilities. Researchers are trying to determine the neural basis for memory by finding out how the brain encodes different memories in the hippocampus.

A patient thinks about moving a mouse pointer. The brain-computer interface takes that thought and translates it on the screen.

By mimicking the natural coding of the brain with electrical stimulation, researchers look to replace compromised hippocampal regions and restore function. Treatment for several conditions that impact cognition such as stroke, Alzheimer's disease and head trauma can benefit from the development of a hippocampal prosthetic. Epilepsy has also been linked to dysfunction in the CA3 region of the hippocampus.

=== Brain-computer interfaces ===
A Brain-computer interface (BCI) is a type of implant that allows for a direct connection between a patient's brain and some form of external hardware. Since the mid-1990s, the amount of research done on BCI's in both animal and human models has grown exponentially. Most brain-computer interfaces are used for some form of neural signal extraction, while some attempt to return sensation through an implanted signal. As an example of signal extraction, a BCI may take a signal from a paraplegic patient's brain and use it to move a robotic prosthetic. Paralyzed patients get a great amount of utility from these devices because they allow for a return of control to the patient. Current research for brain-computer interfaces is focused on determining which regions of the brain can be manipulated by an individual. A majority of research focuses on the sensorimotor region of the brain, using imagined motor actions to drive the devices, while some studies have sought to determine if the cognitive control network would be a suitable location for implantations. This region is a "neuronal network that coordinates mental processes in the service of explicit intentions or tasks," driving the device by intent, rather than imagined motion An example of returning sensation through an implanted signal would be developing a tactile response for a prosthetic limb. Amputees have no touch response in artificial limbs, but through an implant in their somatosensory cortex could potentially give them an artificial sense of touch.

A current example of a brain-computer interface would be the BrainGate, a device developed by Cyberkinetics. This BCI is currently undergoing a second round of clinical trials as of May 2009. An earlier trial featured a patient with a severe spinal cord injury, with no control over any of his limbs. He succeeded in operating a computer mouse with only thoughts. Further developments have been made that allow for more complex interfacing, such as controlling a robotic arm.

The applications of BCIs have been emerging over the years, particularly in addressing the challenges posed by neurodegenerative diseases such as amyotrophic lateral sclerosis (ALS), Parkinson's disease (PD), Alzheimer's disease (AD), and spinal muscular atrophy (SMA).

In AD, a progressive fatal neurodegenerative disorder, BCIs face challenges due to cognitive decline. Some innovative studies used a technique called "classical conditioning with functional magnetic resonance imaging (fMRI) and BCIs.". The main idea was to form a connection between certain intentional mental activities or thoughts and emotional responses or stimuli. Despite limitations, this novel approach seems to hold potential for the neurorehabilitation of AD.

BCIs also play a role in enhancing motor function by translating neuronal firing into motor commands in PD, which is characterized by motor impairments. Research using local field potentials from deep brain stimulation (DBS) electrodes has shown improvements in motor functions. Neurofeedback through BCIs, based on electroencephalography (EEG) or fMRI, has been explored to regulate brain activity. BCIs with EEG feedback primarily aim to specifically detect intentional movements, with the goal of reducing neurological tremors when combined with technologies like functional electrical stimulation (FES).

Moreover, BCIs offer potential improvements in muscle control in SMA patients, those who suffer from neurodegeneration in the anterior horn of the spinal cord, resulting in progressive muscle weakness. Some studies with SMA patients have explored integrating BCIs into control systems to enable remote devices such as TVs and telephones. Other studies have focused on enabling SMA individuals to manipulate a robotic arm using surface electromyography (sEMG).

== Advantages ==
Perhaps one of the biggest advantages that cortical implants have over other neuroprostheses is being directly interfaced with the cortex. Bypassing damaged tissues in the visual pathway allows for a wider range of treatable patients. These implants can also act as a replacement for damage tissues in the cortex. The idea of biomimicry allows for the implant to act as an alternate pathway for signals.

== Disadvantages ==
Having any sort of implant that is directly connected to the cortex presents some issues. A major issue with cortical implants is biocompatibility, or how the body will respond to a foreign object. If the body rejects the implant, then the implant will be more of a detriment to the patient instead of a benefit. In addition to biocompatibility, once the implant is in place, the body may have an adverse reaction to it over an extended period of time, rendering the implant useless. Implanting a microelectrode array can cause damage to the surrounding tissue. Development of scar tissue around the electrodes can prevent some signals from reaching the neurons the implant is meant to. Most microelectrode arrays require neuronal cell bodies to be within 50 μm of the electrodes to provide the best function, and studies have shown that chronically implanted animals have significantly reduced cell density within this range. Implants have been shown to cause neurodegeneration at the site of implantation as well.

Neural coding represents a difficulty faced by cortical implants, and in particular, implants dealing with cognition. Researchers have found difficulty in determining how the brain codes distinct memories. For example, the way the brain codes the memory of a chair is vastly different from the way it codes for a lamp. With a full understanding of the neural code, more progress can be made in developing a hippocampal prosthetic that can more effectively enhance memory.

Due to the uniqueness of every patient's cortex, it is difficult to standardize procedures involving direct implantation. There are many common physical features between brains, but an individual gyrus or sulcus (neuroanatomy) can be different when compared. This leads to difficulties because it causes each procedure to be unique, thus taking longer to perform. In addition, the nature of a microelectrode array intended effect is limited due to the stated variance's presented in association with individual cortex uniqueness i.e. differences. Present day microelectrode arrays are also constrained due their physical size, and achievable data processing/capability rates; which continue to be governed in relation to the characteristics dictated in accordance with Moore's Law.

== Future developments ==
As more research is performed on, further developments will be made that will increase the viability and usability of cortical implants. Decreasing the size of the implants would help with keeping procedures less complicated and reducing the bulk. The longevity of these devices is also being considered as developments are made. The goal with the development of new implants is "to avoid the hydrolytic, oxidative and enzymatic degradation due to the harsh environment of the human body or at least to slow it down to a minimum which enables the interface to work over a long time period, before it finally has to be exchanged." With extended operational lifetimes, fewer operations would need to be performed for maintenance, allowing for The amount of polymers that are now able to be used for neural implants has increased, allowing for a greater diversity of devices. As technology improves, researchers are able to more densely place electrodes into arrays, permitting high selectivity. Other areas of investigation are the battery packs that power these devices. Effort has been made to try and reduce the overall size and bulkiness of these packs to make them less obtrusive for the patient. Reducing the amount of power each implant requires is also of interest, as this will reduce the amount of heat the implant makes, therefore reducing the risk of damage to the surrounding tissues.
