= Stimulator =

Stimulator may refer to:

- something that provides stimulation

== Medicine ==
- Spinal cord stimulator, an implantable neuromodulation device
- Sacral nerve stimulator, for bladder and/or bowel control
  - Sacral anterior root stimulator
- Thalamic stimulator, to suppress tremors
- Vagus nerve stimulator, for epilepsy and treatment-resistant depression

== Music ==
- Stimulator (band), an American alternative rock band
- The Stimulators, an American punk rock band

== Other uses ==
- Stimulator (dry fly), an artificial fly for fishing
- Stimulator (gastropod), a genus of mollusc
