= Lumbar anterior root stimulator =

Neuroprosthesis

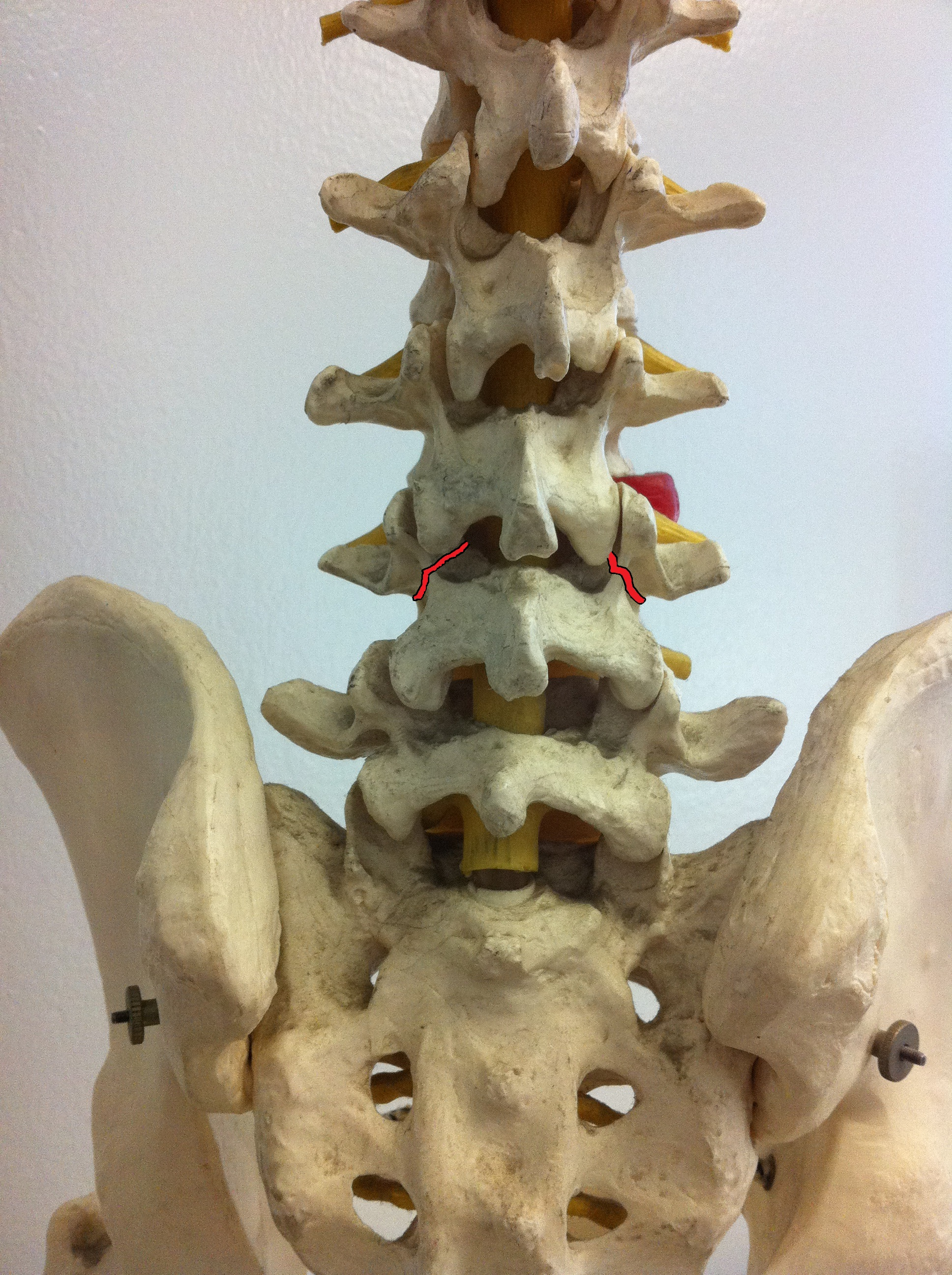
A model showing the lumbar spinal area and pelvis, with spondylosis of the lumbar spine

A lumbar anterior root stimulator is a type of neuroprosthesis used in patients with a spinal cord injury or to treat some forms of chronic spinal pain. More specifically, the root stimulator can be used in patients who have lost proper bowel function due to damaged neurons related to gastrointestinal control and potentially allow paraplegics to exercise otherwise paralyzed leg muscles.

== Usage ==
The lumbar anterior root stimulator is similar in nature to Brindley's sacral anterior root stimulator. The difference in nomenclature is derived from which nerve roots on the spinal cord are being electrically stimulated. However the two types may be used in conjunction and may be referred to as sacro-lumbar root stimulators or lumbo-sacral root stimulators which seem to be the most researched in literature. The stimulators are implanted from the anterior side due to easier access of the spine below the cervical vertebrae.

=== Bowel control ===
Loss of bowel control due to severed nerves in the spinal cord is one of the more common reasons for lumbar root stimulator usage. Patients in such a condition often experience gastrointestinal issues such as incontinence, diarrhea, or an inability to completely evacuate the urinary tract. This is in turn puts the patient at further risk for more complications such as a urinary tract infection. Giles Brindley initially developed for paraplegic patients with diminished or no bladder control as severed neurons affected both the gastrointestinal system and the mobility of the lower limbs. Root stimulators are mounted onto the anterior roots of the spinal cord and electrically stimulate the neurons allowing them to propagate signals in their respective pathways and thus restore overall gastrointestinal function. Additional studies showed that a rhizotomy may also be performed on patients with the implant to reduce sensory reflexes which may otherwise inhibit the device's function. The procedure has been shown to both improve the device's function and reduce overall patient discomfort since the device is less likely to be rejected by the patient's body.

=== Treatment of chronic pain ===
The spine is an important part of pain sensation as many pathways pass from the extremities through the spine into the brain. As such, dysfunctional nerves in the spine can unnecessarily signal pain even when there is no reason for the pain. Some research has been conducted in potentially using the prosthesis to help treat chronic pain related to failed back syndrome or discogenic low back pain as an alternative to stimulating the entire dorsal column. Stimulation of the nerve roots has been shown as a potential alternative for those who suffer chronic pain and either have not had success with conventional spinal cord stimulation or do not qualify for that treatment option. The stimulators are able to focus stimulation on the nerve roots of the spine and hypothetically improve the relief of neuropathic pain signals sent through the spinal cord. The study showed some promise as all subjects indicated some degree of pain relief. While this method may be more effective, it carries with it important risks that must be considered. Direct stimulation of the root risks greater neurological damage due to intra-operative spinal cord injury which in turn would yield further complications.

=== Muscle stimulation ===
Donaldson and Perkins theorized the ability to use lumbar root stimulation in conjunction with a multi-moment chair in order to restore control of leg function in paraplegic patients. A multi-moment chair is a device used to record movement data of the leg in different directions. The researchers were able to generate muscle action through the devices and were later able to display leg control in a cycling paraplegic patient. Lumbar root stimulation poses unique advantage over peripheral motor nerves stimulation in terms of accessibility to target effectors. Activation of peripheral motor nerves is limited to small group of muscles and thus stimulation will only result in a considerably more localized response. On the other hand, root stimulation operates at a higher level of muscle control and therefore has wider targeting. The inherent tradeoff is the difficulty of controlling and predicting the response of the targets. The multi-moment chair was used to measure the responsiveness of the muscle across multiple axes to predict how stimulation of the root would affect the quadriceps and create more predictive model to better understand the relationship between lumbar root stimulation and the leg response. An ongoing problem for patients with paralysis was the inability to exercise the muscles causing them to atrophy. Using the previous study, researchers focused on using the sacro-lumbar anterior root stimulator to give patients the ability to cycle. Cycling is non-weight bearing has a simpler motion compared to other forms of low impact exercises such as walking. The stimulators allowed one patient cycle up to 1.2 km in one try and were able to create a "fluid cycling gait."

== Related issues ==
=== Spinal cord injury ===
Spinal cord injuries have many causes, and result in a high comorbidity. In other words, individuals with spinal cord injuries tend to develop many other health problems due to the importance of the spine in the central nervous system. SCI has a prevalence of up to 55 per million people in the United States alone while approximately 10,000 new cases occur annually. Car crashes are the highest contributor while violence and recreational activities are causes as well. While spinal cord injury is a broad and widely-encompassing term, root stimulators may be used for many instances of SCIs. For example, certain cases of spinal cord injuries may sever key nerves necessary to maintain bladder and bowel control. The severance is often the cause of Neurogenic Bowel Dysfunction. Similarly, spinal cord injuries can potentially cause a loss of motor control in lower limbs, such as with paraplegic and tetraplegic patients. Stimulators, in turn, may be used to stimulate the muscle and treat motor control loss in order to regain function in the limbs.

=== Gastrointestinal issues ===
As mentioned previously, neurogenic bowel dysfunction tends to occur after some form of spinal cord injury in which nerves important to control of sphincter contraction, bowel movements, and bladder control are severed or damaged. Lumbar root stimulators have been used in order to treat bowel dysfunction by allowing the patient to regain control of both excretory muscles and organs. Regaining such motor control prevents further complications associated with NBD such as constipation, incontinence, and irritable bowel syndrome. However, lumbar anterior root stimulators are not effective for all gastrointestinal issues. In the case of bladder control, contractions are controlled by the parasympathetic efferent pathways of the sacral section of the spine which renders lumbar stimulation ineffective. On the other hand, bladder control is closely associated with parasympathetic pathways on both the sacral and lumbar sections of the spine thus making sacro-lumbar anterior root stimulators a more viable option as it can deal with both sets of issues.

=== Paraplegia ===
Paraplegia is a condition in which a person loses the ability to control or perceive his or her lower limbs. Patients that have lost functional limb control due to spinal cord injuries often have further complications past the point of injury. Due to paralysis, paraplegics remain unable to exercise the leg muscles and leads to muscle atrophy. In such cases, lumbar anterior root stimulators may offer a minimal and temporary solution by allowing paraplegics some capacity to exercise the legs. Some research has shown that root stimulators may allow cycling to be feasible to those who have paraplegia as a proof of concept. The devices may show promise in applications of more complex leg movement processes such as walking. At the very least, they offer a potential solution to delaying the issue of atrophy in paraplegics so that they might have an easier recovery in the case that better treatments come along.

== Complications ==
Root stimulators are far from being perfect as there are many potential complications. Approximately 18% of patients with root stimulators have reported issues with the device. Approximately 8% of stimulator reports are due to cerebrospinal fluid collecting around the stimulator which inhibits stimulator function and causes significant discomfort to the patient. Another 8% of cases are caused by receiver failure in which the patient is unable to use the stimulator effectively or is in some way "incompatible" with the implant. The final 2% is associated with some type of disease that requires removal of the device and puts the patient at great risk. Two major studies have been associated with issues in root stimulators. One twenty-nine-year-old male cervical spinal cord injury patient had severe complications with a sacral anterior root stimulator. The patient received the implant due to a traffic collision in 1978. The patient experienced increased spasms which inhibited daily functions such as sleeping or trying to get into his car. Later on, he had delayed lumbar spinal fracture at the site of the implant which required its subsequent retraction. The spasms reduced in intensity when the patient decided to discontinue the use of the sacral anterior root stimulator and instead chose to use an indwelling urethral catheter. The case was cited as "compelling evidence for disuse" of the device.

A more recent 2009 study focused on a tetraplegic SCI patient whose stimulator was infected by Pseuomana aeruginosa which was found after blood-stained fluid started leaking out of a post-operative wound several days after the device was implanted. As in the aforementioned case, the patient had the device removed and lost considerable function of bowel and urinary bladder control. He had recurring instances of fecal incontinence which left him almost completely immobile and reported significant distress due to the incident. Other issues due to the failed implantation included constipation, an inability to empty the bladder, and a loss of reflexive penile erection. The case identified the high risk associated with the usage of root stimulators.
