= Cyberware =

Hardware implanted in the human body and/or brain

Cyberware refers to technology that integrates directly with the human nervous system, typically through implants or interfaces that enable communication between machines and the body.

Once largely a concept within science fiction, cyberware is now an emerging field of biomedical research and neurotechnology, with applications ranging from brain–computer interfaces to advanced prosthetics. The term encompasses both sensory-enhancing implants and control systems that translate neural signals into digital outputs.

While still in its early stages, cyberware has gained renewed interest in the 21st century through companies like Neuralink and BrainGate, as well as ongoing research into human–machine symbiosis.

== Interfaces ("headware") ==
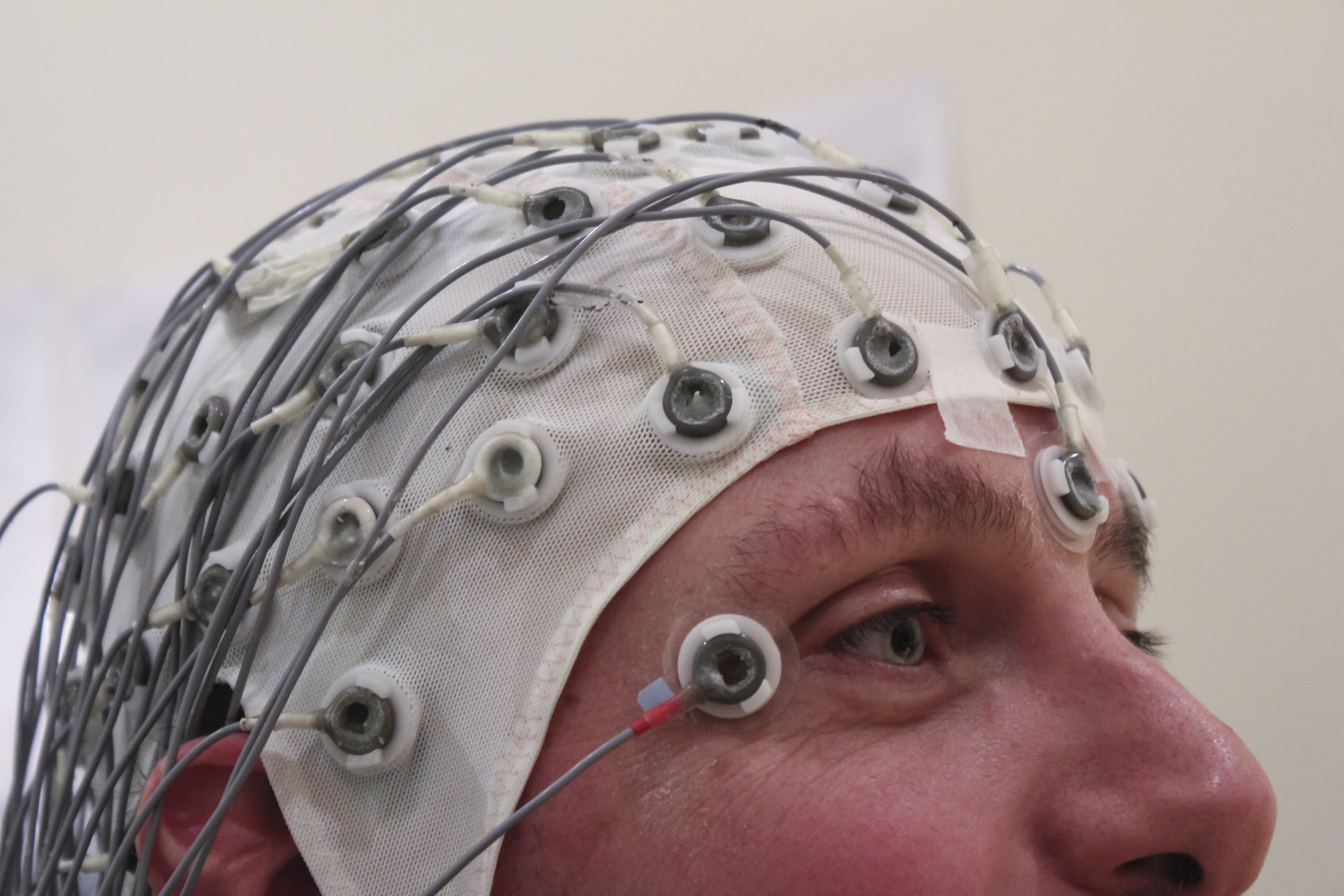

It is the most difficult object to implement, but it is also the most important in terms of interfacing directly with the mind. In science fiction the data-jack is the envisioned I/O port for the brain. Its job is to translate thoughts into something meaningful to a computer, and to translate something from a computer into meaningful thoughts for humans. Once perfected, it would allow direct communication between computers and the human mind.

Large university laboratories conduct most of the experiments done in the area of direct neural interfaces. For ethical reasons, the tests are usually performed on animals or slices of brain tissue from donor brains. The mainstream research focuses on electrical impulse monitoring, recording and translating the many different electrical signals that the brain transmits.

A number of companies are working on what is essentially a "hands-free" mouse or keyboard. This technology uses these brain signals to control computer functions. These interfaces are sometimes called brain-machine interfaces (BMI).

The more intense research, concerning full in-brain interfaces, is being studied, but is in its infancy. Few can afford the huge cost of such enterprises, and those who can find the work slow-going and very far from the ultimate goals. Research has reached the level where limited control over a computer is possible using thought commands alone. After being implanted with a Massachusetts-based firm Cyberkinetics chip called BrainGate, a quadriplegic man was able to compose and check email.

In April 2021, BrainGate became the first technology to transmit wireless commands from a human brain to a computer. The clinical trial involved two participants with spinal cord injuries, using a transmitter connected to the brain’s motor cortex to send neural signals wirelessly. Researchers reported that the speed and accuracy of cursor control and typing matched that of previous wired systems.

In 2016, entrepreneur Elon Musk co-founded Neuralink, a neurotechnology company focused on developing implantable brain–computer interfaces. The company initially aimed to address neurological disorders, with a long-term vision of human cognitive enhancement. As of its early funding rounds, Neuralink had raised $158 million, including $100 million from Musk personally.

== Prosthetics ("bodyware") ==
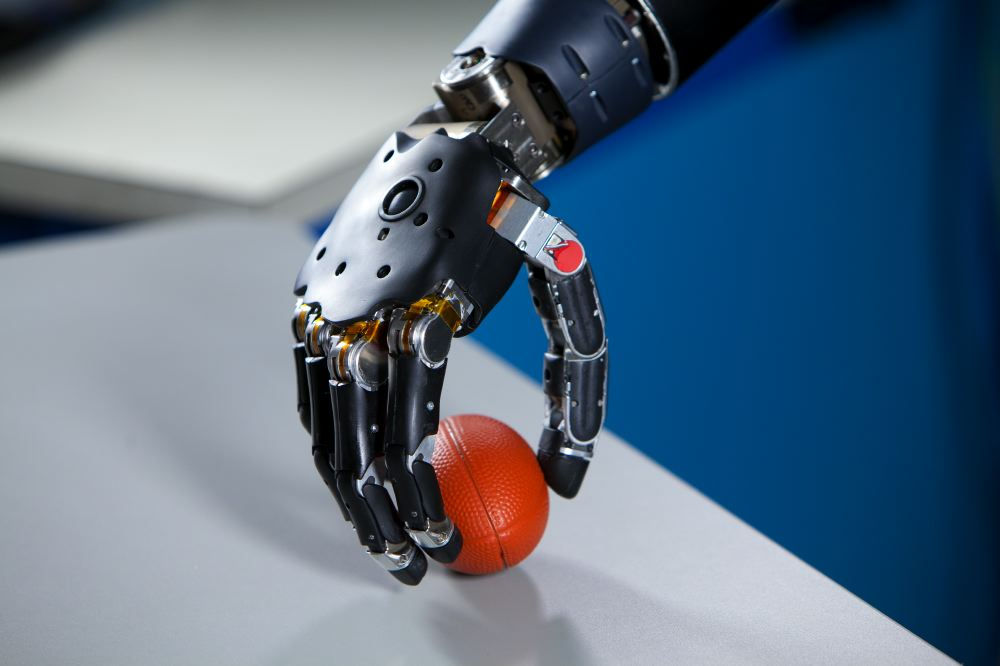

The second variety of cyberware consists of a more modern form of the rather old field of prosthetics.

Modern prostheses attempt to deliver a natural functionality and appearance. In the sub-field where prosthetics and cyberware cross over, experiments have been done where microprocessors, capable of controlling the movements of an artificial limb, are attached to the severed nerve-endings of the patient. The patient is then taught how to operate the prosthetic, trying to learn how to move it as though it were a natural limb.

Crossing over between prostheses and interfaces are those pieces of equipment attempting to replace lost senses. An early success in this field is the cochlear implant. A tiny device inserted into the inner ear, it replaces the functionality of damaged, or missing, hair cells (the cells that, when stimulated, create the sensation of sound).

This device comes firmly under the field of prosthetics, but experiments are also being performed to tap into the brain. Coupled with a speech-processor, this could be a direct link to the speech centres of the brain.

== In popular culture ==
A brain data-jack is heavily featured in works of fiction, including Cyberpunk 2077, Johnny Mnemonic, the cartoon Exosquad, and The Matrix.

== See also ==
- Biomechatronics
- Biorobotics
- Brain–computer interface
- Brain-reading
- BrainGate
- Cybernetics
- Neural engineering
- Neuroprosthetics
- Neurotechnology
- Posthumanization
- Simulated reality
- Transhuman
- Wetware (brain)
