= Gregory A. Clark =

American neuroscientist

- Education: Postdoctoral Fellow, Columbia University; Ph.D. University of California Irvine, Department of Psychobiology; B.A. Brown University, Psychology
- Scientific career
- Fields: Neuroprosthetics; Neuroengineering; Sensory Information Processing; Neuroplasticity; Electrophysiology
- Workplaces: Stanford University; Columbia University; Princeton University; University of Utah
- Thesis: Role of cerebellum and limbic structures in classical conditioning of the rabbit nictitating membrane/eyeblink response.
- Doctoral advisor: Richard F. Thompson
- Website: https://faculty.utah.edu/u0027862-GREGORY_A_CLARK/hm/index.hml

Gregory A. Clark is a professor in the Departments of Biomedical Engineering and Computer Science at the University of Utah; he is also the Director for the Center for Neural Interfaces at the University of Utah. Dr. Clark’s current research is in neuroprostheses, bioengineering, sensory information processing, and electrophysiological and computational analyses of neuronal plasticity in simple systems.

== Education ==
Dr. Clark studied Psychology at Brown University; after receiving his B.A., Dr.Clark completed his Ph.D. with the Department of Psychobiology at the University of California, Irvine.

== Career and research ==
In 1981 Dr. Clark lectured for the Department of Psychology at Stanford University. Upon leaving Stanford, Dr. Clark went to the College of Physicians and Surgeons at Columbia University. While there, he completed a postdoctoral fellowship at the Center for Neurobiology and Behavior between 1982 and 1984, continued on as a research associate at the Howard Hughes Medical Institute for Molecular Neurobiology between 1984 and 1988, and became an instructor of clinical neurobiology for the Department of Psychiatry and Center for Neurobiology and Behavior from 1986 to 1988.

Following his time at Columbia, Dr. Clark became an assistant professor in the Department of Psychology at Princeton University from 1988 to 1996. After his time at Princeton, he became an associate professor in the Department of Biomedical Engineering at the University of Utah in 1996, gaining tenure in 2001. In 2009 he became an adjunct associate professor in the Department of Computer Science at the University of Utah. In 2015, he became the director of the Center for Neural Interfaces.

Dr. Clark has made contributions to a variety of research areas, including neuroprostheses, bioengineering, sensory information processing, and electrophysiological and computational analyses of neuronal plasticity in simple systems (Aplysia and Hermissenda). Specifically, these contributions have included improvements to intrafascicular functional electrical stimulation allowing for coordinated and fatigue resistant motor unit activation and improvements in the use of peripherally implanted microelectrodes for restoration of motor control and sensory feedback in neuroprosthetics.

Many of Dr. Clark’s publications have examined the foreign body response to the Utah Slant Electrode Array. By performing immunohistochemistry on arrays that were implanted in a cat sciatic nerve over a period that ran between 2 and 26 weeks, he found that persistent inflammation was present at all sites and each time period after implantation of the Utah Slant Electrode Array. Additionally, Dr. Clark studied a non-invasive method for selection of electrodes and stimulus parameters for functional electrical stimulation applications with intrafascicular arrays. This included the implantation of Utah Slant Electrode Arrays and utilized endpoint forces to determine individual electrode effects and electrode-electrode interactions.

In addition to his work in academia, Dr. Clark has published numerous articles in the lay press with most of his publications addressing the intersection of science, religion, education, and politics

== Selected awards and honors ==
- Dean's Selection as one of the Top Recipients of Extramural Funding, College of Engineering, University of Utah, 2013, 2014
- Dean's Selection as a Top Graduate Teacher (Lectures), College of Engineering, University of Utah, 2013, 2014
- Dean's Selection as a Top Undergraduate Teacher (Labs, Discussions, Seminars), College of Engineering, University of Utah, 2012
- Deans' Letter of Commendation, College of Engineering, University of Utah, 2000, 2002, 2008, 2011
- Pew Biomedical Scholar Award, 1989-1995
- Alfred P. Sloan Fellowship, 1990-1992
- NIMH Postdoctoral Fellowship, 1982-1984
- NIMH Predoctoral Fellowship, 1981-1982
- University of California Regents' Dissertation Fellowship, 1980
- Edward G. Steinhaus Graduate Student Teaching Award, University of California, Irvine, 1979
- Chancellor's Patent Fund Award, 1979
- Edward G. Steinhaus Graduate Student Teaching Award, University of California, Irvine, 1979
- Regents' Fellow of the University of California, 1976
