= Christine E. Schmidt =

American biomedical engineer

Academic background
- Education: BS, Chemical Engineering, 1988, University of Texas at Austin; PhD, Chemical Engineering, 1995, University of Illinois

Christine E. Schmidt is an American biomedical engineer. As a professor at the University of Florida, Schmidt was inducted into the Florida Inventors Hall of Fame for her creation of the Avance Nerve Graft which has "improved the lives of numerous patients suffering from peripheral nerve damage." In 2024, Schmidt was elected to both the National Academy of Engineering and the National Academy of Medicine.

== Early life and education ==
Schmidt earned her Bachelor of Science degree in chemical engineering from the University of Texas at Austin and her PhD from the University of Illinois.

== Career ==
=== University of Texas at Austin ===
Upon completing her PhD, Schmidt joined the faculty at her alma mater, the University of Texas at Austin, as an assistant professor in the Biomedical Engineering Department and Chemical Engineering Department. From 2002 until 2007, she was an associate professor during which she was recognized as one of the most highly cited academics in her field. Schmidt and her research team also found a piece of protein that could attach itself to polypyrrole and be used towards biomedical applications. The results of her study found a way to modify a plastic to anchor molecules that promote nerve regeneration, blood vessel growth or other biological processes. In 2006, Schmidt was appointed to the editorial boards of the International Journal of Nanomedicine, Journal of Biomaterials Science, Polymer Edition and later the Journal of Biomedical Materials Research.

As a Full professor, Schmidt was the inaugural recipient of the Chairmen's Distinguished Life Sciences Award for her "research achievements in the area of neural engineering." While working in her lab with two graduate students, they co-developed an enzyme treatment that could be used to create an acellular nerve graft from human cadaver tissue. Later, she also developed a new technique, which could re-direct neurons along three-dimensional paths in culture, that can improve the way researchers approach repairing damaged nerves in the clinic.

In 2010, Schmidt was the elected a Fellow of the National Science Foundation (NSF) Division of Materials Research as someone whose "research that is likely to be transformative and potentially of high impact and who have contributed outstanding broader impacts through their promotion of diversity in the U.S. scientific and engineering workforce." She was later elected as a Fellow of the Biomedical Engineering Society's (BMES) 2010 class and named a Distinguished Engineering Graduate by the Cockrell School of Engineering.

=== University of Florida ===
Schmidt left the University of Texas at Austin in 2013 to become the Chair of the J. Crayton Pruitt Family Department of Biomedical Engineering at the University of Florida (UF). In her first year with the department, Schmidt and her research team began working to restore nerve function by grafting cadaver tissue onto the damaged area to act as a scaffold for nerves to re-grow themselves. She was also elected a Fellow of the American Association for the Advancement of Science for her efforts to "advance science or scientific applications that are deemed scientifically or socially distinguished." Following this, Schmidt was appointed to the editorial board for the Journal of Neural Engineering and received the Women's Initiatives Committee's Mentorship Excellence Award from the American Institute of Chemical Engineers as a faculty member who has "contributed to the development of the next generation of chemical engineers."

In 2015, Schmidt was awarded a UF Research Opportunity Seed Fund for her project "Engineering Tissue Mimics to Investigate Congenital Heart Disease." The aim of her project was to engineer cardiac tissue mimics to investigate the role biophysical and biochemical cues play in the progression of congenital heart disease. Following this, her research earned her national recognition and Schmidt was named president-elect of the American Institute for Medical and Biological Engineering. She was also awarded the 2019 Clemson Award for Applied Research from the Society for Biomaterials and named a Fellow of the National Academy of Inventors (NAI). Her election to the NAI was due to her work in materials and cellular/tissue engineering leading to a "significant clinical impact on nerve repair and post-surgical wound care management."

In 2020, Schmidt was inducted into the Florida Inventors Hall of Fame for her creation of the Avance Nerve Graft which has "improved the lives of numerous patients suffering from peripheral nerve damage."
