= Matt Nagle =

American murder victim

Matthew Nagle (October 16, 1979 – July 24, 2007) was the first person to use a brain–computer interface to restore functionality lost due to paralysis. He was a C3 tetraplegic, paralyzed from the neck down after being stabbed.

== Biography ==
Nagle attended Weymouth High School (Class of 1998). He was an exceptional athlete and a star football player. In 2001, he sustained a stabbing injury while leaving the town's annual fireworks show near Wessagussett Beach on July 3. He was stabbed and his spinal cord severed when he stepped in to help a friend.

Nagle died on July 24, 2007, in Stoughton, Massachusetts, from sepsis.

== BrainGate Clinical Trial ==
Nagle agreed to participate in a clinical trial involving the BrainGate Neural Interface System (developed by Cyberkinetics) out of a desire to again be healthy and lead a normal life, and in hopes that modern medical discoveries could help him. He also hoped that his participation in this Clinical Trial would help improve the lives of people who, like him, suffered injuries or diseases that cause severe motor disabilities.

The device was implanted on June 22, 2004, by neurosurgeon Gerhard Friehs. A 96-electrode "Utah Array" was placed on the surface of his brain over the region of motor cortex that controlled his dominant left hand and arm. A link connected it to the outside of his skull, where it could be connected to a computer. The computer was then trained to recognize Nagle's thought patterns and associate them with movements he was trying to achieve.

While he was implanted, Matt could control a computer "mouse" cursor, using it then to press buttons that can control TV, check e-mail, and do basically everything that can be done by pressing buttons. He could draw (although the cursor control is not precise) on the screen. He could also send commands to an external prosthetic hand (close and open). The results of the study are published in the journal Nature. Per Food and Drug Administration (FDA) regulations and the study protocol, the BrainGate device was removed from him after approximately one year.

I can't put it into words. It's just—I use my brain. I just thought it. I said, "Cursor go up to the top right." And it did, and now I can control it all over the screen. It will give me a sense of independence.

— Matthew Nagle, "Brain Gain"

== Charges against assailant ==
On June 5, 2008, a grand jury in Norfolk County, Massachusetts, indicted on a second-degree murder charge Nagle's attacker Nicholas Cirignano. Cirignano had in 2005 been convicted of Nagle's stabbing and sentenced to nine years' imprisonment. District Attorney William Keating used the state medical examiner's ruling that the stabbing had caused Nagle's eventual death as grounds to seek the murder charge.

On April 10, 2009, a Superior Court Judge ruled that Cirignano could not be tried for murder, as the jury's verdict from the original assault case had already determined that one of the key components to a murder charge, malice, was negated by excessive force in self-defence. However, the lesser charge of manslaughter could still, in theory, be applied.
