= Neurosecurity =

Neurosecurity has been defined as "a version of computer science security principles and methods applied to neural engineering", or more fully, as "the protection of the confidentiality, integrity, and availability of neural devices from malicious parties with the goal of preserving the safety of a person's neural mechanisms, neural computation, and free will". Simply put, Neurosecurity is, at least in principle, an antivirus and firewall for the mind. Neurosecurity also refers to the application of neuroscience to behavioral information security to better understand and improve users' security behaviors. Neurosecurity is a distinct concept from neuroethics; neurosecurity is effectively a way of enforcing a set of neuroethical principles for a neural device. As neural devices and brain-derived datasets move toward broader clinical use, neurosecurity increasingly includes safeguards calibrated to the source, sensitivity, context, and intended use of neural data. Neurosecurity is also distinct from the application of neuroscience to national security, a topic that is addressed in Mind Wars: Brain Research and National Defense by Jonathan D. Moreno.

The Center for Neurotechnology Studies of the Potomac Institute for Policy Studies, in Arlington, VA, US works with a number of university and governmental partners on issues, problems and protocols for neurosecurity. James Giordano, Director of the Center, defines neurosecurity as "concepts, practices, guidelines and policies dedicated to identifying threats to, and preserving the integrity of neuro-psychiatric information about persons, groups and populations obtained in neuroscientific research and/or through the use of neurotechnologies (such as neuroimaging, neurofeedback, neurogenetics, and neuro-computational data banks) in medicine, the social sphere, and national intelligence and defense".

== Popular culture ==
- The anime series Ghost in the Shell: Stand Alone Complex (2002–2003) prominently features hackers manipulating neural implants. One example is the Laughing Man's use of hacking to interfere with the reports of eyewitnesses. In another example, Major Kusanagi makes a point by taking control of some of Batou's implants and forcing him to punch himself.
- Neal Stephenson's book The Diamond Age (1995) briefly refers to corporations hacking neural implants in order to superimpose advertisements onto a user's field of vision.
- The world in video game Remember Me is set in the world where memory manipulation is commonplace.

== See also ==
- Brain implant
- Brain-reading
- Cyberware
- Hacker (computer security)
- Neuroprosthetics
