= Neuroprosthetics =

Discipline related to neuroscience and biomedical engineering

Neuroprosthetics (also called neural prosthetics) is a discipline related to neuroscience and biomedical engineering concerned with developing neural prostheses. They are sometimes contrasted with a brain–computer interface, which connects the brain to a computer rather than a device meant to replace missing biological functionality.

Neural prostheses are a series of devices that can substitute a motor, sensory or cognitive modality that might have been damaged as a result of an injury or a disease. Cochlear implants provide an example of such devices. These devices substitute the functions performed by the eardrum and stapes while simulating the frequency analysis performed in the cochlea. A microphone on an external unit gathers the sound and processes it; the processed signal is then transferred to an implanted unit that stimulates the auditory nerve through a microelectrode array. Through the replacement or augmentation of damaged senses, these devices are intended to improve the quality of life for those with disabilities.

These implantable devices are also commonly used in animal experimentation as a tool to aid neuroscientists in developing a greater understanding of the brain and its functioning. By wirelessly monitoring the brain's electrical signals sent out by electrodes implanted in the subject's brain, the subject can be studied without the device affecting the results. Accurately probing and recording the electrical signals in the brain would help better understand the relationship among a local population of neurons that are responsible for a specific function.

Neural implants are designed to be as small as possible in order to be minimally invasive, particularly in areas surrounding the brain, eyes, or cochlea. These implants typically communicate with their prosthetic counterparts wirelessly. Additionally, power is currently received through wireless power transmission through the skin. The tissue surrounding the implant is usually highly sensitive to temperature rise, meaning that power consumption must be minimal in order to prevent tissue damage.

The neuroprosthetic currently undergoing the most widespread use is the cochlear implant, with over 736,900 in use worldwide as of 2019.

== History ==
The first known cochlear implant was created in 1957. Other milestones include the first motor prosthesis for foot drop in hemiplegia in 1961, the first auditory brainstem implant in 1977 and a peripheral nerve bridge implanted into the spinal cord of an adult rat in 1981. In 1988, the lumbar anterior root implant and functional electrical stimulation (FES) facilitated standing and walking, respectively, for a group of paraplegics.

Regarding the development of electrodes implanted in the brain, an early difficulty was reliably locating the electrodes, originally done by inserting the electrodes with needles and breaking off the needles at the desired depth. Recent systems utilize more advanced probes, such as those used in deep brain stimulation to alleviate the symptoms of Parkinson's disease. The problem with either approach is that the brain floats free in the skull while the probe does not, and relatively minor impacts, such as a low speed car accident, are potentially damaging. Some researchers, such as Kensall Wise at the University of Michigan, have proposed tethering 'electrodes to be mounted on the exterior surface of the brain' to the inner surface of the skull. However, even if successful, tethering would not resolve the problem in devices meant to be inserted deep into the brain, such as in the case of deep brain stimulation (DBS).

== Sensory prosthetics ==
=== Visual prosthetics ===
A visual prosthesis can create a sense of image by electrically stimulating neurons in the visual system. A camera would wirelessly transmit to an implant, the implant would map the image across an array of electrodes. The array of electrodes has to effectively stimulate 600–1000 locations, stimulating these optic neurons in the retina thus will create an image. The stimulation can also be done anywhere along the optic signal's pathway. The optical nerve can be stimulated in order to create an image, or the visual cortex can be stimulated, although clinical tests have proven most successful for retinal implants.

A visual prosthesis system consists of an external (or implantable) imaging system which acquires and processes the video. Power and data will be transmitted to the implant wirelessly by the external unit. The implant uses the received power/data to convert the digital data to an analog output which will be delivered to the nerve via micro electrodes.

Photoreceptors are the specialized neurons that convert photons into electrical signals. They are part of the retina, a multilayer neural structure about 200 μm thick that lines the back of the eye. The processed signal is sent to the brain through the optical nerve. If any part of this pathway is damaged blindness can occur.

Blindness can result from damage to the optical pathway (cornea, aqueous humor, crystalline lens, and vitreous). This can happen as a result of accident or disease. The two most common retinal degenerative diseases that result in blindness secondary to photoreceptor loss is age related macular degeneration (AMD) and retinitis pigmentosa (RP).

The first clinical trial of a permanently implanted retinal prosthesis was a device with a passive microphotodiode array with 3500 elements. This trial was implemented at Optobionics, Inc., in 2000. In 2002, Second Sight Medical Products, Inc. (Sylmar, CA) began a trial with a prototype epiretinal implant with 16 electrodes. The subjects were six individuals with bare light perception secondary to RP. The subjects demonstrated their ability to distinguish between three common objects (plate, cup, and knife) at levels statistically above chance. An active sub retinal device developed by Retina Implant GMbH (Reutlingen, Germany) began clinical trials in 2006. An IC with 1500 microphotodiodes was implanted under the retina. The microphotodiodes serve to modulate current pulses based on the amount of light incident on the photo diode.

The seminal experimental work towards the development of visual prostheses was done by cortical stimulation using a grid of large surface electrodes. In 1968 Giles Brindley implanted an 80 electrode device on the visual cortical surface of a 52-year-old blind woman. As a result of the stimulation the patient was able to see phosphenes in 40 different positions of the visual field. This experiment showed that an implanted electrical stimulator device could restore some degree of vision. Recent efforts in visual cortex prosthesis have evaluated efficacy of visual cortex stimulation in a non-human primate. In this experiment after a training and mapping process the monkey is able to perform the same visual saccade task with both light and electrical stimulation.

The requirements for a high resolution retinal prosthesis should follow from the needs and desires of blind individuals who will benefit from the device. Interactions with these patients indicate that mobility without a cane, face recognition and reading are the main necessary enabling capabilities.

The results and implications of fully functional visual prostheses are exciting. However, the challenges are grave. In order for a good quality image to be mapped in the retina a high number of micro-scale electrode arrays are needed. Also, the image quality is dependent on how much information can be sent over the wireless link. Also this high amount of information must be received and processed by the implant without much power dissipation which can damage the tissue. The size of the implant is also of great concern. Any implant would be preferred to be minimally invasive.

With this new technology, several scientists, including Karen Moxon at Drexel, John Chapin at SUNY, and Miguel Nicolelis at Duke University, started research on the design of a sophisticated visual prosthesis. Other scientists have disagreed with the focus of their research, arguing that the basic research and design of the densely populated microscopic wire was not sophisticated enough to proceed.

=== Auditory prosthetics ===
Cochlear implants (CIs), auditory brain stem implants (ABIs), and auditory midbrain implants (AMIs) are the three main categories for auditory prostheses. CI electrode arrays are implanted in the cochlea, ABI electrode arrays stimulate the cochlear nucleus complex in the lower brain stem, and AMIs stimulate auditory neurons in the inferior colliculus. Cochlear implants have been very successful among these three categories. Today the Advanced Bionics Corporation, the Cochlear Corporation and the Med-El Corporation are the major commercial providers of cochlear implants.

In contrast to traditional hearing aids that amplify sound and send it through the external ear, cochlear implants acquire and process the sound and convert it into electrical energy for subsequent delivery to the auditory nerve. The microphone of the CI system receives sound from the external environment and sends it to processor. The processor digitizes the sound and filters it into separate frequency bands that are sent to the appropriate tonotonic region in the cochlea that approximately corresponds to those frequencies.

In 1957, French researchers A. Djourno and C. Eyries, with the help of D. Kayser, provided the first detailed description of directly stimulating the auditory nerve in a human subject. The individuals described hearing chirping sounds during stimulation. In 1972, the first portable cochlear implant system in an adult was implanted at the House Ear Clinic. The U.S. Food and Drug Administration (FDA) formally approved the marketing of the House-3M cochlear implant in November 1984.

Improved performance in cochlear implants not only depends on understanding the physical and biophysical limitations of implant stimulation, but also on an understanding of the brain's pattern processing requirements. Modern signal processing represents the most important speech information while also providing the brain the pattern recognition information that it needs. Pattern recognition in the brain is more effective than algorithmic preprocessing at identifying important features in speech. A combination of engineering, signal processing, biophysics, and cognitive neuroscience was necessary to produce the right balance of technology to maximize the performance of auditory prosthesis.

Cochlear implants have been also used to allow acquiring of spoken language development in congenitally deaf children, with remarkable success in early implantations (before 2–4 years of life have been reached). There have been about 80,000 children implanted worldwide.

The concept of combining simultaneous electric-acoustic stimulation (EAS) for the purposes of better hearing was first described by C. von Ilberg and J. Kiefer, from the Universitätsklinik Frankfurt, Germany, in 1999. That same year the first EAS patient was implanted. Since the early 2000s FDA has been involved in a clinical trial of device termed the "Hybrid" by Cochlear Corporation. This trial is aimed at examining the usefulness of cochlea implantation in patients with residual low-frequency hearing. The "Hybrid" utilizes a shorter electrode than the standard cochlea implant, since the electrode is shorter it stimulates the basil region of the cochlea and hence the high-frequency tonotopic region. In theory these devices would benefit patients with significant low-frequency residual hearing who have lost perception in the speech frequency range and hence have decreased discrimination scores.

For producing sound see Speech synthesis.

=== Prosthetics for pain relief ===
The SCS (Spinal Cord Stimulator) device has two main components: an electrode and a generator. The technical goal of SCS for neuropathic pain is to mask the area of a patient's pain with a stimulation induced tingling, known as "paresthesia", because this overlap is necessary (but not sufficient) to achieve pain relief. Paresthesia coverage depends upon which afferent nerves are stimulated. The most easily recruited by a dorsal midline electrode, close to the pial surface of spinal cord, are the large dorsal column afferents, which produce broad paresthesia covering segments caudally.

In ancient times the electrogenic fish was used as a shocker to subside pain. Healers had developed specific and detailed techniques to exploit the generative qualities of the fish to treat various types of pain, including headache. Because of the awkwardness of using a living shock generator, a fair level of skill was required to deliver the therapy to the target for the proper amount of time. (Including keeping the fish alive as long as possible) Electro analgesia was the first deliberate application of electricity. By the nineteenth century, most western physicians were offering their patients electrotherapy delivered by portable generator. In the mid-1960s, however, three things converged to ensure the future of electro stimulation.

1. Pacemaker technology, which had it start in 1950, became available.
2. Melzack and Wall published their gate control theory of pain, which proposed that the transmission of pain could be blocked by stimulation of large afferent fibers.
3. Pioneering physicians became interested in stimulating the nervous system to relieve patients from pain.

The design options for electrodes include their size, shape, arrangement, number, and assignment of contacts and how the electrode is implanted. The design option for the pulse generator includes the power source, target anatomic placement location, current or voltage source, pulse rate, pulse width, and a number of independent channels. Programming options are very numerous (a four-contact electrode offers 50 functional bipolar combinations). The current devices use computerized equipment to find the best options for use. This reprogramming option compensates for postural changes, electrode migration, changes in pain location, and suboptimal electrode placement.

== Motor prosthetics ==
Devices which support the function of autonomous nervous system include the implant for bladder control. In the somatic nervous system attempts to aid conscious control of movement include Functional electrical stimulation and the lumbar anterior root stimulator.

=== Bladder control implants ===
Where a spinal cord lesion leads to paraplegia, patients have difficulty emptying their bladders and this can cause infection. From 1969 onwards Brindley developed the sacral anterior root stimulator, with successful human trials from the early 1980s onwards. This device is implanted over the sacral anterior root ganglia of the spinal cord; controlled by an external transmitter, it delivers intermittent stimulation which improves bladder emptying. It also assists in defecation and enables male patients to have a sustained full erection.

The related procedure of sacral nerve stimulation is for the control of incontinence in able-bodied patients.

=== Motor prosthetics for conscious control of movement ===
Researchers are currently investigating and building motor neuroprosthetics that will help restore movement and the ability to communicate with the outside world to persons with motor disabilities such as tetraplegia or amyotrophic lateral sclerosis. Research has found that the striatum plays a crucial role in motor sensory learning. This was demonstrated by an experiment in which lab rats' firing rates of the striatum was recorded at higher rates after performing a task consecutively.

To capture electrical signals from the brain, scientists have developed microelectrode arrays smaller than a square centimeter that can be implanted in the skull to record electrical activity, transducing recorded information through a thin cable. After decades of research in monkeys, neuroscientists have been able to decode neuronal signals into movements. Completing the translation, researchers have built interfaces that allow patients to move computer cursors, and they are beginning to build robotic limbs and exoskeletons that patients can control by thinking about movement.

The technology behind motor neuroprostheses is still in its infancy. Investigators and study participants continue to experiment with different ways of using the prostheses. Having a patient think about clenching a fist, for example, produces a different result than having him or her think about tapping a finger. The filters used in the prostheses are also being fine-tuned, and in the future, doctors hope to create an implant capable of transmitting signals from inside the skull Wirelessly, as opposed to through a cable.

Prior to these advancements, Philip Kennedy (Emory and Georgia Tech) had an operable if somewhat primitive system which allowed an individual with paralysis to spell words by modulating their brain activity. Kennedy's device used two neurotrophic electrodes: the first was implanted in an intact motor cortical region (e.g. finger representation area) and was used to move a cursor among a group of letters. The second was implanted in a different motor region and was used to indicate the selection.

Developments continue in replacing lost arms with cybernetic replacements by using nerves normally connected to the pectoralis muscles. These arms allow a slightly limited range of motion, and reportedly are slated to feature sensors for detecting pressure and temperature.

Dr. Todd Kuiken at Northwestern University and Rehabilitation Institute of Chicago has developed a method called targeted reinnervation for an amputee to control motorized prosthetic devices and to regain sensory feedback.

In 2002 a Multielectrode array of 100 electrodes, which now forms the sensor part of a Braingate, was implanted directly into the median nerve fibers of scientist Kevin Warwick. The recorded signals were used to control a robot arm developed by Warwick's colleague, Peter Kyberd and was able to mimic the actions of Warwick's own arm. Additionally, a form of sensory feedback was provided via the implant by passing small electrical currents into the nerve. This caused a contraction of the first lumbrical muscle of the hand and it was this movement that was perceived.

In June 2014, Juliano Pinto, a paraplegic athlete, performed the ceremonial first kick at the 2014 FIFA World Cup using a powered exoskeleton with a brain interface. The exoskeleton was developed by the Walk Again Project at the laboratory of Miguel Nicolelis, funded by the government of Brazil. Nicolelis says that feedback from replacement limbs (for example, information about the pressure experienced by a prosthetic foot touching the ground) is necessary for balance. He has found that as long as people can see the limbs being controlled by a brain interface move at the same time as issuing the command to do so, with repeated use the brain will assimilate the externally powered limb and it will start to perceive it (in terms of position awareness and feedback) as part of the body.

=== Amputation techniques ===
The MIT Biomechatronics Group has designed a novel amputation paradigm that enables biological muscles and myoelectric prostheses to interface neurally with high reliability. This surgical paradigm, termed the agonist-antagonist myoneural interface (AMI), provides the user with the ability to sense and control their prosthetic limb as an extension of their own body, rather than using a prosthetic that merely resembles an appendage. In a normal agonist-antagonist muscle pair relationship (e.g. bicep-tricep), when the agonist muscle contracts, the antagonist muscle is stretched, and vice versa, providing one with the knowledge of the position of one's limb without even having to look at it. During a standard amputation, agonist-antagonist muscles (e.g. bicep-tricep) are isolated from each other, preventing the ability to have the dynamic contract-extend mechanism that generates sensory feedback. Therefore, current amputees have no way of feeling the physical environment their prosthetic limb encounters. Moreover, with the current amputation surgery which has been in place for over 200 years, 1/3 patients undergo revision surgeries due to pain in their stumps.

An AMI is composed of two muscles that originally shared an agonist-antagonist relationship. During the amputation surgery, these two muscles are mechanically linked together within the amputated stump. One AMI muscle pair can be created for each joint degree of freedom in a patient in order to establish control and sensation of multiple prosthetic joints. In preliminary testing of this new neural interface, patients with an AMI have demonstrated and reported greater control over the prosthesis. Additionally, more naturally reflexive behavior during stair walking was observed compared to subjects with a traditional amputation. An AMI can also be constructed through the combination of two devascularized muscle grafts. These muscle grafts (or flaps) are spare muscle that is denervated (detached from original nerves) and removed from one part of the body to be re-innervated by severed nerves found in the limb to be amputated. Through the use of regenerated muscle flaps, AMIs can be created for patients with muscle tissue that has experienced extreme atrophy or damage or for patients who are undergoing revision of an amputated limb for reasons such as neuroma pain, bone spurs, etc.

== Obstacles ==
=== Mathematical modelling ===
Accurate characterization of the nonlinear input/output (I/O) parameters of the normally functioning tissue to be replaced is paramount to designing a prosthetic that mimics normal biologic synaptic signals. Mathematical modeling of these signals is a complex task "because of the nonlinear dynamics inherent in the cellular/molecular mechanisms comprising neurons and their synaptic connections". The output of nearly all brain neurons are dependent on which post-synaptic inputs are active and in what order the inputs are received. (spatial and temporal properties, respectively).

Once the I/O parameters are modeled mathematically, integrated circuits are designed to mimic the normal biologic signals. For the prosthetic to perform like normal tissue, it must process the input signals, a process known as transformation, in the same way as normal tissue.

=== Size ===
Implantable devices must be very small to be implanted directly in the brain, roughly the size of a quarter. One of the example of microimplantable electrode array is the Utah array.

Wireless controlling devices can be mounted outside of the skull and should be smaller than a pager.

=== Power consumption ===
Power consumption drives battery size. Optimization of the implanted circuits reduces power needs. Implanted devices currently need on-board power sources. Once the battery runs out, surgery is needed to replace the unit. Longer battery life correlates to fewer surgeries needed to replace batteries. One option that could be used to recharge implant batteries without surgery or wires is being used in powered toothbrushes. These devices make use of inductive charging to recharge batteries. Another strategy is to convert electromagnetic energy into electrical energy, as in radio-frequency identification tags.

=== Biocompatibility ===
Cognitive prostheses are implanted directly in the brain, so biocompatibility is a very important obstacle to overcome. Materials used in the housing of the device, the electrode material (such as iridium oxide), and electrode insulation must be chosen for long term implantation. Subject to Standards: ISO 14708-3 2008-11-15, Implants for Surgery - Active implantable medical devices Part 3: Implantable neurostimulators.

Crossing the blood–brain barrier can introduce pathogens or other materials that may cause an immune response. The brain has its own immune system that acts differently from the immune system of the rest of the body.

=== Data transmission ===
Wireless Transmission is being developed to allow continuous recording of neuronal signals of individuals in their daily life. This allows physicians and clinicians to capture more data, ensuring that short term events like epileptic seizures can be recorded, allowing better treatment and characterization of neural disease.

A small, light weight device has been developed that allows constant recording of primate brain neurons at Stanford University. This technology also enables neuroscientists to study the brain outside of the controlled environment of a lab.

Methods of data transmission between neural prosthetics and external systems must be robust and secure. Wireless neural implants can have the same cybersecurity vulnerabilities as any other IT system, giving rise to the term neurosecurity. A neurosecurity breach can be considered a violation of medical privacy.

=== Correct implantation ===
Implantation of the device presents many problems. First, the correct presynaptic inputs must be wired to the correct postsynaptic inputs on the device. Secondly, the outputs from the device must be targeted correctly on the desired tissue. Thirdly, the brain must learn how to use the implant. Various studies in brain plasticity suggest that this may be possible through exercises designed with proper motivation.

== Technologies involved ==
=== Local field potentials ===
Local field potentials (LFPs) are electrophysiological signals that are related to the sum of all dendritic synaptic activity within a volume of tissue. Recent studies suggest goals and expected value are high-level cognitive functions that can be used for neural cognitive prostheses. Also, Rice University scientists have discovered a new method to tune the light-induced vibrations of nanoparticles through slight alterations to the surface to which the particles are attached. According to the university, the discovery could lead to new applications of photonics from molecular sensing to wireless communications. They used ultrafast laser pulses to induce the atoms in gold nanodisks to vibrate.

=== Automated movable electrical probes ===
One hurdle to overcome is the long term implantation of electrodes. If the electrodes are moved by physical shock or the brain moves in relation to electrode position, the electrodes could be recording different nerves. Adjustment to electrodes is necessary to maintain an optimal signal. Individually adjusting multi electrode arrays is a very tedious and time-consuming process. Development of automatically adjusting electrodes would mitigate this problem. Anderson's group is currently collaborating with Yu-Chong Tai's lab and the Burdick lab (all at Caltech) to make such a system that uses electrolysis-based actuators to independently adjust electrodes in a chronically implanted array of electrodes.

=== Imaged guided surgical techniques ===
Image-guided surgery is used to precisely position brain implants.

== See also ==
- Biomedical engineering
- Brain–computer interface
- Brain-reading
- Cyborg
- Experience machine
- Neural engineering
- Neurosecurity
- Prosthetic neuronal memory silicon chips
- Prosthetics
- Simulated reality
- Wirehead (science fiction)
