= Stimulator (dry fly) =

Artificial fly

- Artificial fly
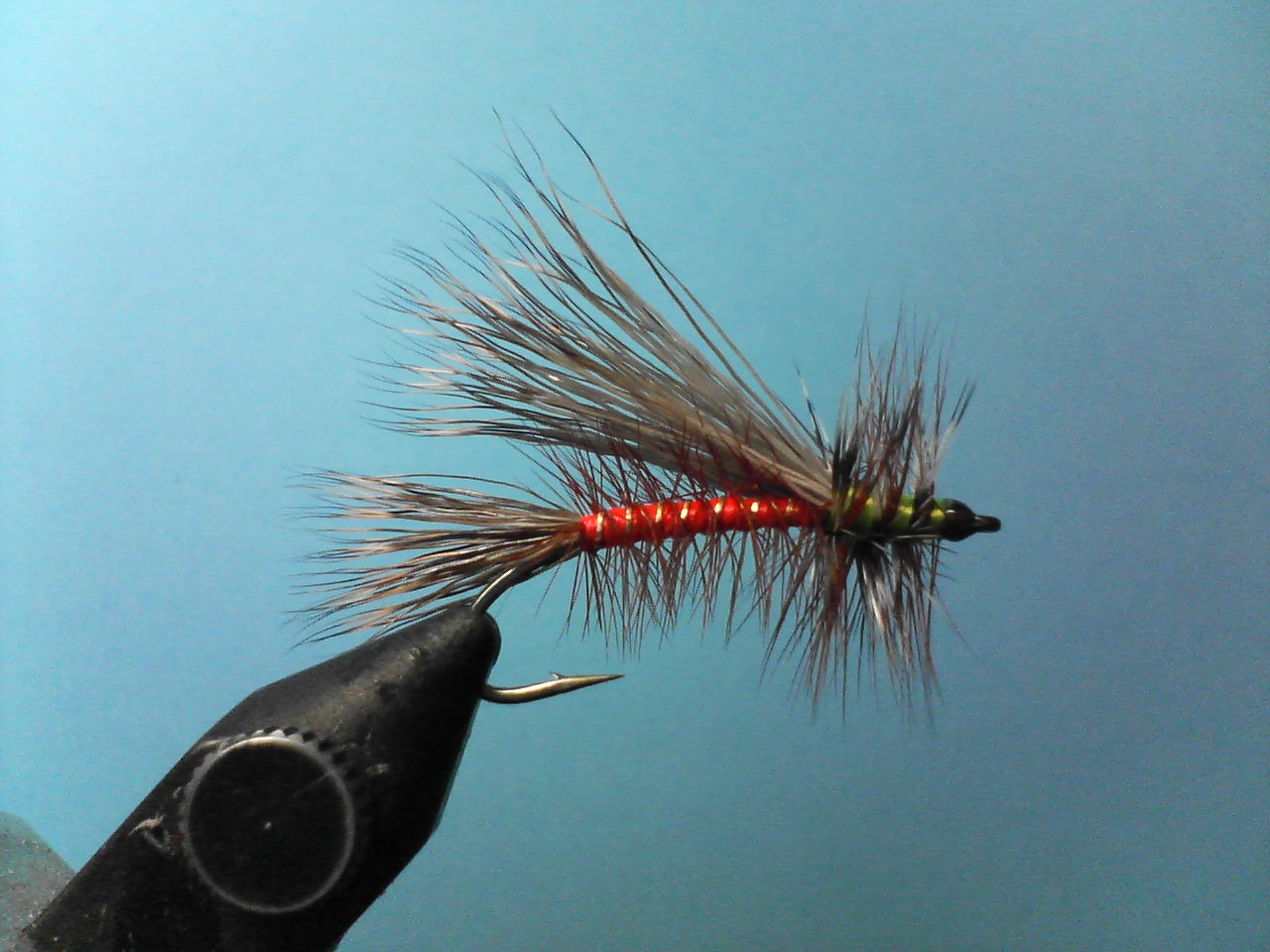
- Orange stimulator
- Type: Dry fly
- Imitates: Adult stoneflies, caddis, grasshoppers

History
- Creator: Jim Slattery, Randall Kaufmann

Materials
- Typical sizes: 6-18 3X long
- Typical hooks: TMC 200R, Firehole 718
- Thread: 6/0, 140 denier
- Tail: Deer or Elk
- Body: Dry fly dubbing, floss
- Wing: Deer or Elk
- Ribbing: Dry fly hackle
- Hackle: Dry fly hackle
- Thorax: Dry fly dubbing

Uses
- Primary use: Trout

The Stimulator is a dry fly popularized by angler, fly tyer and author Randall Kaufmann to imitate large adult stoneflies.

== Origin ==
The Stimulator pattern is a derivative of earlier stonefly patterns—the Improved Sofa Pillow (1940s) and Yellow-bellied Mattress Trasher (1970s). Many anglers believe the name Stimulator was given to the pattern by Jim Slattery, a Montana angler who renamed his Fluttering Stonefly pattern. Others contend the pattern was derived from the Trude style dry flies developed in 1903. However, the pattern was clearly popularized and promoted by Randall Kaufmann, a fly shop owner, angler and author in Seattle, WA and Portland, OR in the 1980s.

== Imitates ==
Originally tied to imitate large stoneflies, the Stimulator is also useful to imitate adult caddis, grasshoppers and large mayflies.

== Materials ==
- Hook: 3X Long Curved Dry Fly Size 6-18
- Thread: 6/0 or 140 denier matching color to pattern
- Tail: Elk, Deer or Moose hair
- Body: Dry fly dubbing matching color to pattern
- Ribbing: Short dry fly hackle palmered, typically grizzly or brown
- Wing: Deer or Elk hair
- Thorax: Dry fly dubbing matching color to pattern
- Hackle: Dry fly hackle, typically grizzly or brown

== Variations ==
As described in Fly Patterns--Tie Thousands of Flies (2008), Randall and Mary Kaufmann

- Crystal Stimulator (Black, Gold, Green, Orange Peacock, Pearl, Royal Cerise, Tan, Yellow)
- Kaufmann's Stimulator (Green, Orange, Yellow)
- Kaufmann's Stimulator RL (Rubber Legs), (Gray, Lime, Orange, Pearl, Royal, Tan, Yellow)
Stimulator Variations
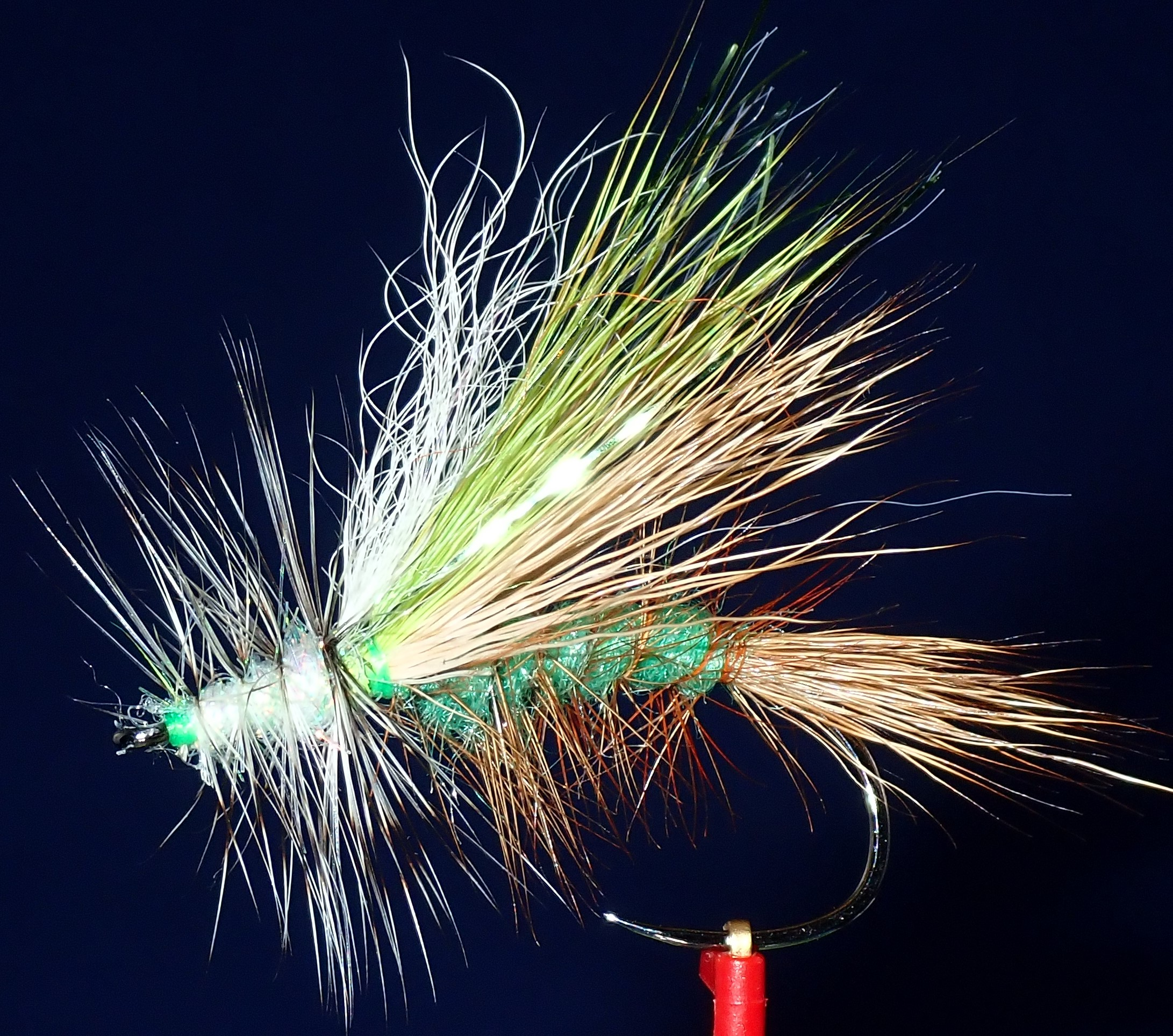
Crystal Stimulator Lime Green

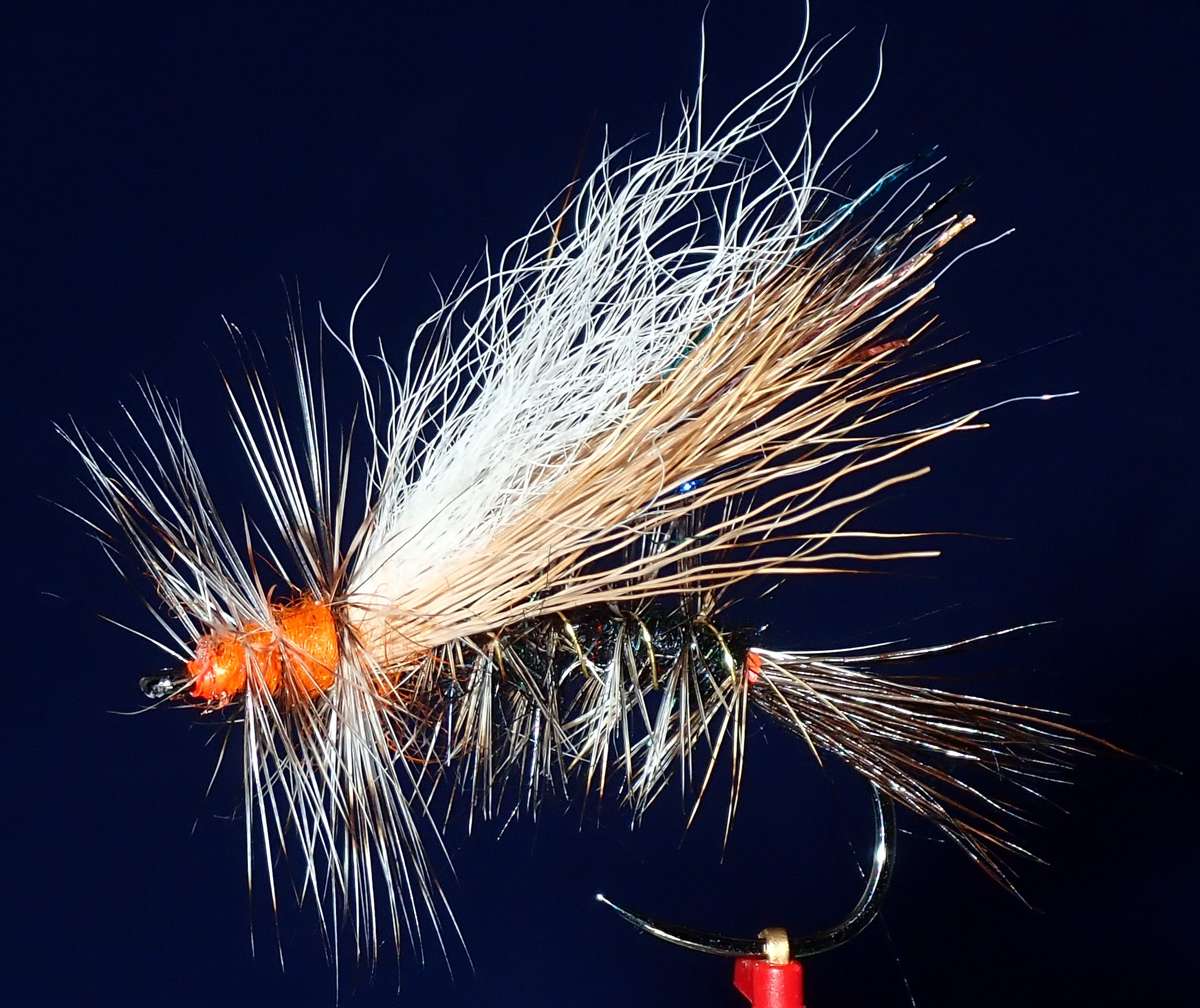
Crystal Stimulator Black

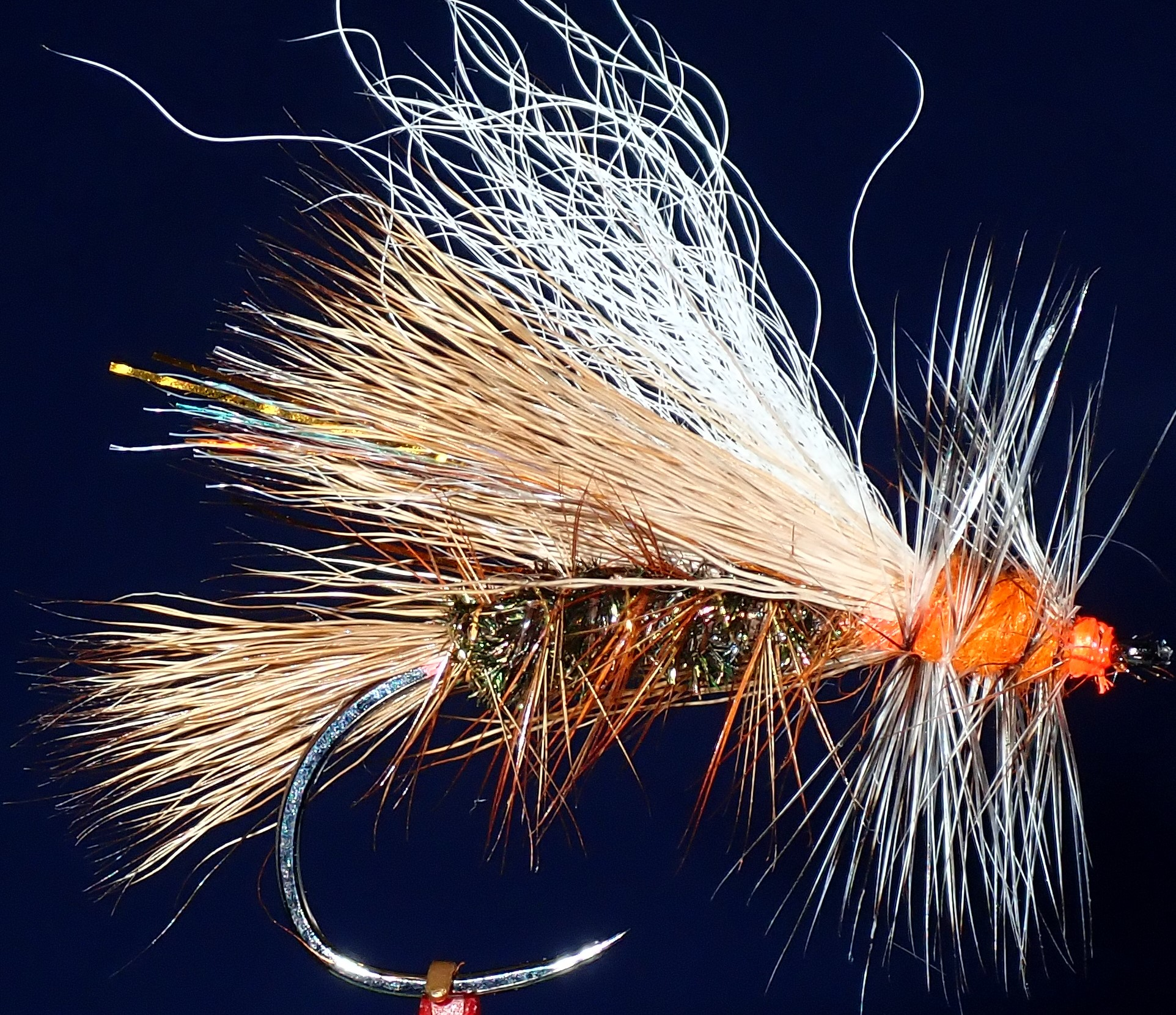
Crystal Stimulator Peacock

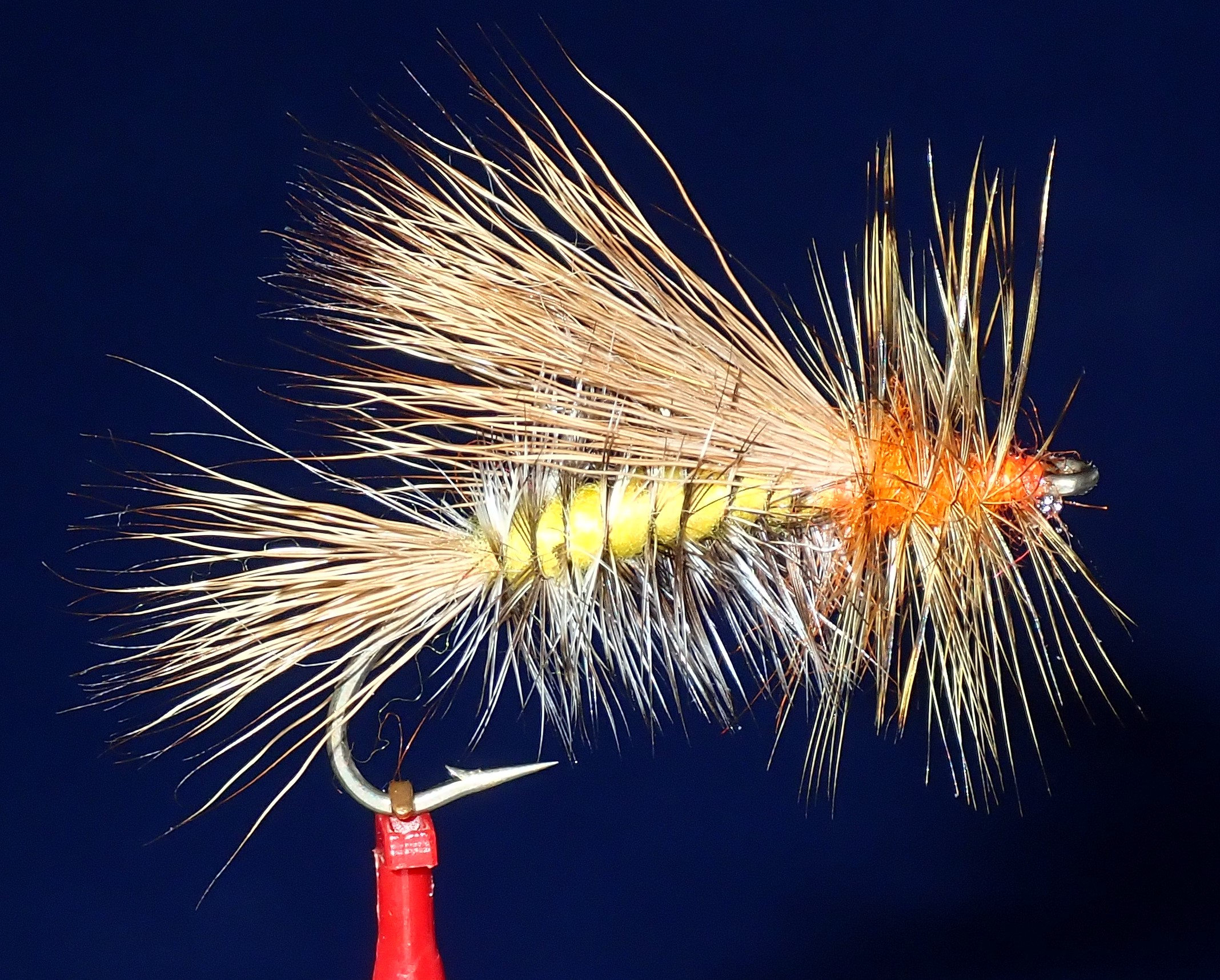
Yellow Stimulator
