= Chondroitinase =

Chondroitinase may refer to:

- N-acetylgalactosamine-4-sulfatase, an enzyme
- N-acetylgalactosamine-6-sulfatase, an enzyme
- Chondroitin ABC lyase, an enzyme
