= Sacral anterior root stimulator =

Medical implant for bladder control

A sacral anterior root stimulator is an implantable medical device enabling patients with a spinal cord lesion to empty their bladders.

== History ==
From 1969 onwards Giles Brindley developed the sacral anterior root stimulator, with successful human trials from the early 1980s onwards. Although both sphincter and detrusor muscles are stimulated at the same time, the slower contraction kinetics of the bladder wall (smooth muscle tissue) compared to the sphincter (striated muscle tissue) mean that voiding occurs between the stimulation pulses, rather than during them.

== Description ==
This device is implanted over the sacral anterior root of the spinal cord; controlled by an external transmitter, it delivers intermittent stimulation which improves the ability to empty the bladder. It may also assist in defecation and also may enable male patients to have a sustained full erection. The device is implanted in one of two regions, either through intrathecal administration or extradurally. It is often performed in conjunction with a dorsal rhizotomy, and many groups believe that the best results are only seen when this procedure is performed alongside the implantation. The rhizotomy will remove sensory reflexes, which in men may include sexual reflexes. For some patients this is a major drawback to the device. For others, the benefits outweigh the downside.

The related procedure of sacral nerve stimulation is to control incontinence in otherwise able-bodied patients.
