= Journal of Neural Engineering =

Scientific journal

- Discipline: Neural engineering
- Language: English
- Edited by: Warren M. Grill

Publication details
- History: 2004—present
- Publisher: IOP Publishing
- Frequency: Bimonthly
- Impact factor: 3.8 (2024)

Standard abbreviations
- ISO 4: J. Neural Eng.

Indexing
- ISSN: 1741-2552 (print); 1741-2552 (web)

Links
- Journal homepage; Online access

Journal of Neural Engineering is a peer-reviewed scientific journal published bimonthly by IOP Publishing. Established in 2004, it covers research on neural engineering at the molecular, cellular and systems levels, including advances in brain–computer interfaces, bioelectronics, neuromorphic computing and computational neuroscience. Its current editor-in-chief is Warren M. Grill (Duke University).

== Abstracting and indexing ==
The journal is abstracted and indexed in:

- Biological Abstracts
- BIOSIS
- Ei Compendex
- MEDLINE
- Science Citation Index Expanded
- Scopus

According to the Journal Citation Reports, the journal has a 2024 impact factor of 3.8.
