= Sacral nerve stimulator =

Medical implant

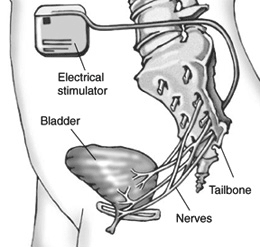
- Sacral nerve stimulator
- Other names: SNS, Sacral nerve implant, Sacral nerve device, Sacral neuromodulation
- Specialty: Urology, gastroenterology
- Uses: Urinary and fecal incontinence
- Complications: Pain at implantation site

A sacral nerve stimulator is a small device usually implanted in the buttocks of people who have problems with bladder and/or bowel control. This device is implanted in the buttock and connected to the sacral nerve S3 by a wire. The device uses sacral nerve stimulation to stop urges to defecate and urinate by sending signals to the sacral nerve. The patient is able to control their bladder and/or bowel via an external device similar to a remote control.

== Medical uses ==
Sacral nerve stimulators are used in many cases of incontinence to include urinary and fecal incontinence. Sacral nerve stimulators are used when more conservative methods have failed.

=== Urinary incontinence ===
SNS have been shown to be effective in patients with refractory urge incontinence, urinary retention and urinary frequency.

== Alternative therapy ==
Before implantation of a sacral nerve stimulator patients are required to have failed more conservative therapy. Patients should be counseled on diet modification, exercises to strengthen pelvic floor muscles, targeted injections and medications that could help improve their incontinence. The methods employed to help the patient are going to be dependent upon the type of incontinence they specifically face. Once patients have failed conservative management they can elect for a trial placement of the sacral nerve stimulator.

If the patient fails management with the sacral nerve stimulator there are addition methods that can be employed. For fecal incontinence patients can consider, sphincteroplasty, colostomy bags, and defect repair.

== Trial ==
=== Fecal incontinence ===
Before the patient undergoes implantation of a permanent stimulator they must undergo a trial that lasts for 2 weeks; if the patient receives adequate relief of symptoms they can be implanted with a permanent stimulator.

=== Urinary incontinence ===
==== Phase 1 ====
Phase one is a temporary placement of an external stimulator. Around fifty percent of people get relief from the trial.

==== Phase 2 ====
Implantation of the permanent stimulator.

== Placement procedure ==
=== Trial ===
For the trial the procedure is normally performed under local anesthetic. The patient is prepped and the wires are placed bilaterally in the S3 foramen. Electrical impulses are passed through the wires to make sure they are placed properly. If placed properly the wires are connected to the external device.

=== Permanent ===
The procedure is performed in an operating room. The S3 foramen are identified and the wires are placed. A pocket is created for the placement of the stimulator. The stimulator is connected to the placed wires and secured into the pocket in the buttock. The patient and the physician work to optimize the settings. Depending on the device the battery may have to be periodically replaced.

== Studies ==
A 2007 review by the Cochrane Collaboration was cautiously optimistic about the results of sacral nerve stimulation in fecal incontinence, although it also concluded that trial periods of stimulation did not adequately identify patients that would benefit from the procedure, and that more longer-term studies were needed.
