= Cyberkinetics =

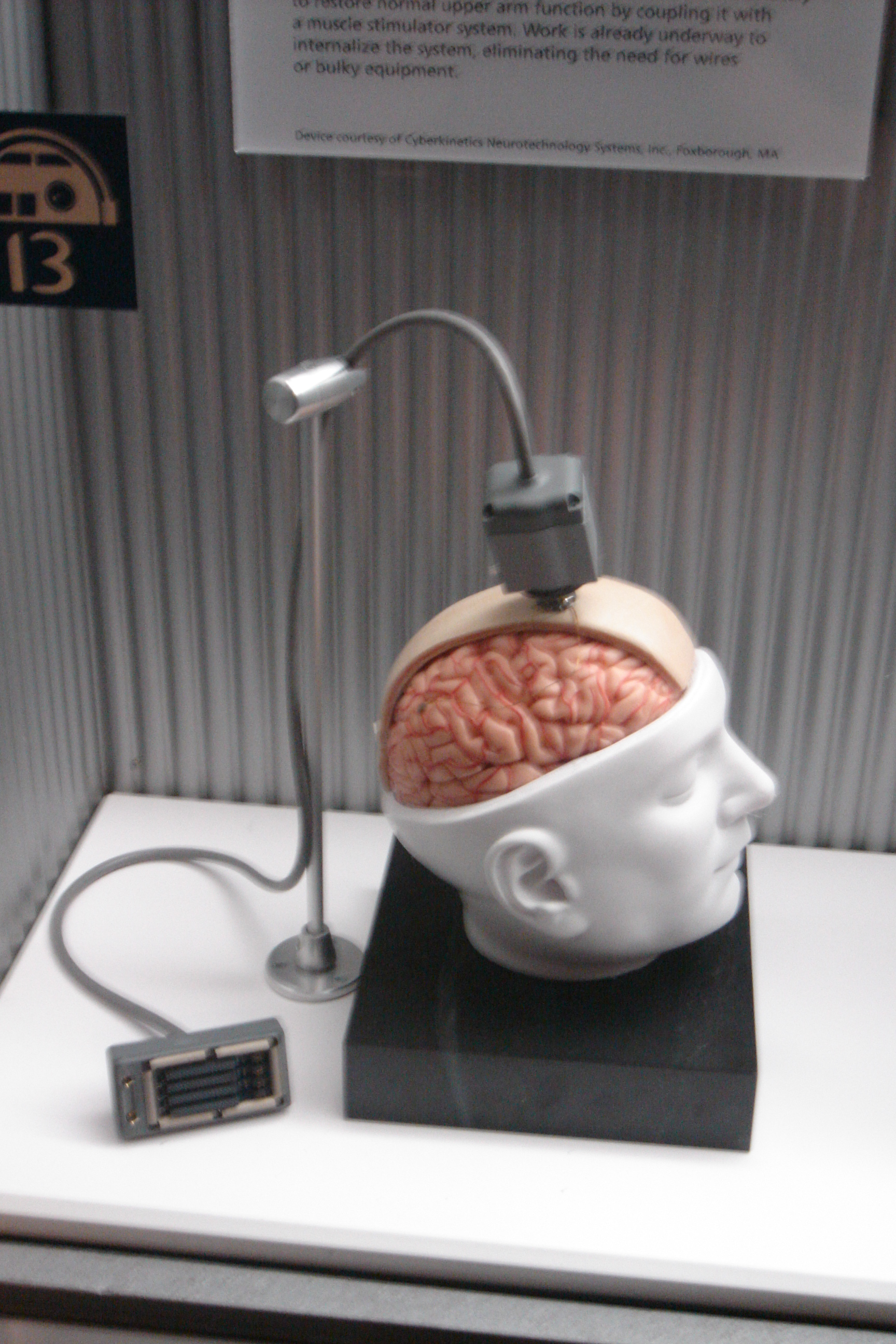

Cyberkinetics is an American company with roots tied to the University of Utah. It was co-founded by John Donoghue, Mijail Serruya, Gerhard Friehs of Brown University, and Nicho Hatsopoulos of the University of Chicago. The Braingate technology and related Cyberkinetic’s assets were sold to Blackrock Neurotech (then Blackrock Microsystems) and BrainGate Inc. in 2008.

== Funding ==
Scientists behind the project used $9.3 million in first round funding led by Oxford Bioscience Partners. A 2002 merger with Bionic Technologies, co-founded by Brian Hatt and Richard A. Normann (the inventor of the Utah array) added to a tech team armed with intellectual property rights gained from Brown, MIT, and others. They say they're three to five years away from putting a product on the market.

According to their latest SEC filing, the Founders of the company resigned from the Board of Directors at the end of October 2008.

== Merger and renaming ==
In late 2004, Cyberkinetics initiated a reverse merger with a Texas company in order to gain access to the public market. The resulting company was renamed Cyberkinetics Neurotechnology Systems, Inc. and its shares are listed under the symbol CYKN.OB. In 2009, the BrainGate business and related Cyberkinetic assets were sold to privately held Braingate, Inc. In the same year, Cyberkinetics was acquired by Blackrock Microsystems, LLC. The acquisition included a small team and ownership of neurophysiological recording devices.

== Clinical trials ==
Since July 8, 2009, clinical trials are being conducted for the Brain Gate 2 Neural Interface System. Since July 16, 2009, the pilot clinical trial of the BrainGate2 Neural Interface System is registered at ClinicalTrials.gov.

== See also ==
- Brain-computer interface
- BrainGate
