= BrainGate =

Brain implant

BrainGate is a brain implant system, currently under development and in clinical trials, designed to help those who have lost control of their limbs, or other bodily functions, such as patients with amyotrophic lateral sclerosis (ALS) or spinal cord injury. The Braingate technology and related Cyberkinetic’s assets are now owned by privately held Braingate, Co. The sensor, which is implanted into the brain, monitors brain activity in the patient and converts the intention of the user into computer commands.

== Technology ==
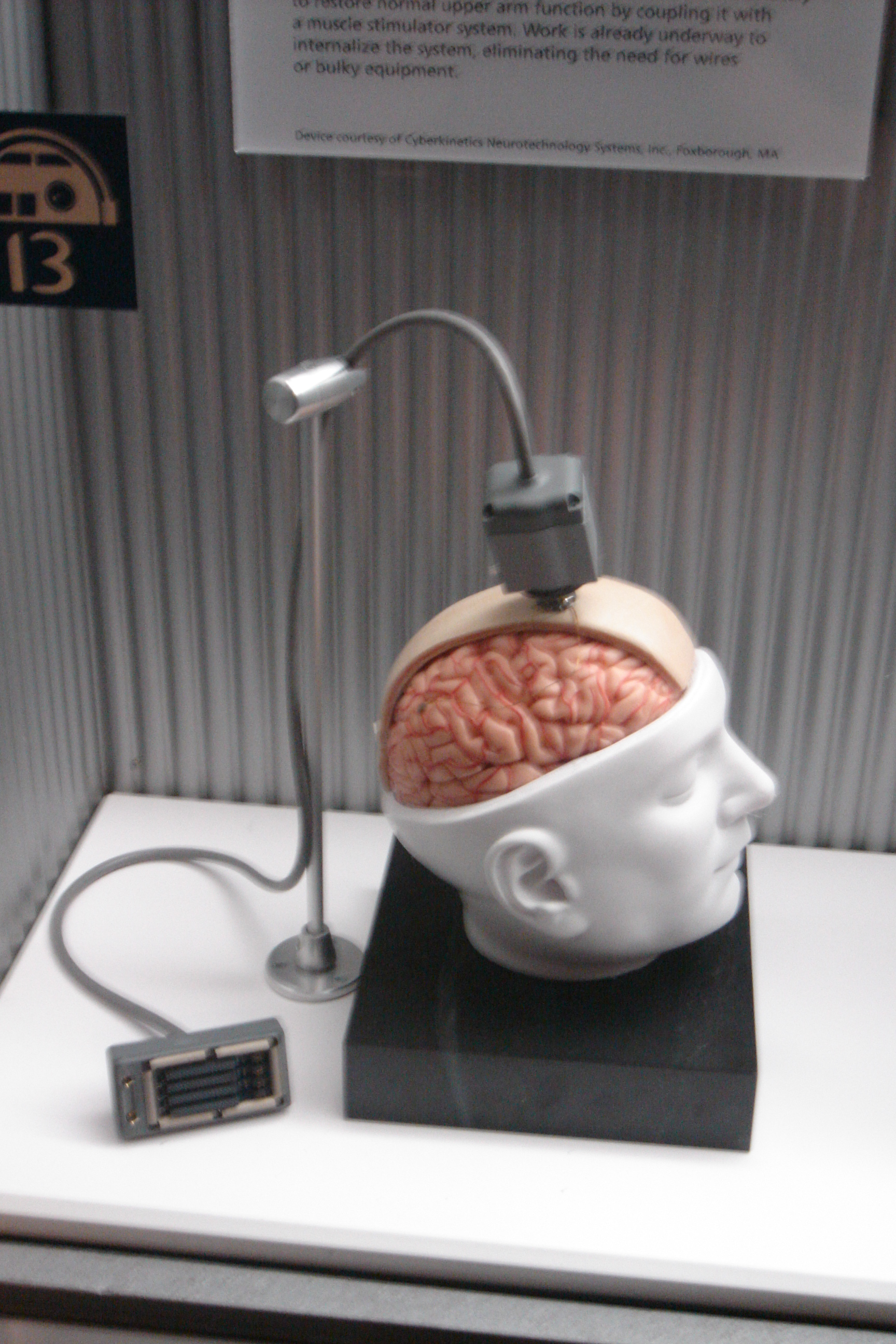
Dummy unit illustrating the design of a BrainGate interface

In its current form, BrainGate consists of a sensor implanted in the brain and an external decoder device, which connects to some kind of prosthetic or other external object. The sensor is in the form of a microelectrode array, formerly known as the Utah Array, which consists of 100 hair-thin electrodes that sense the electromagnetic signature of neurons firing in specific areas of the brain, for example, the area that controls arm movement. The sensor translates that activity into electrically charged signals, which are then sent to an external device and decoded in software. The decoder connects to and can use the brain signals to control an external device, such as a robotic arm, a computer cursor, or even a wheelchair. In essence, BrainGate allows a person to manipulate objects in the world using only the mind.

In addition to real-time analysis of neuron patterns to relay movement, the BrainGate array is also capable of recording electrical data for later analysis. A potential use of this feature would be for a neurologist to study seizure patterns in a patient with epilepsy.

== History ==
BrainGate was originally developed by researchers in the Department of Neuroscience at Brown University in conjunction with bio-tech company Cyberkinetics, Inc. Cyberkinetics later spun off the device manufacturing to Blackrock Neurotech, who now manufactures the sensors and the data acquisition hardware. The BrainGate Company purchased the intellectual property and related technology from Cyberkinetics and continues to own the intellectual property related to BrainGate.

=== Research and experimental results ===
The first reported experiments involving the implantation of the microelectrode array in one human subject were carried out in 2002 by Kevin Warwick, Mark Gasson and Peter Kyberd. The procedure, which was performed at the Radcliffe Infirmary, involved the implantation of the array in the peripheral nerves of the subject in order to successfully bring about both motor and sensory functionality, i.e. bi-directional signalling.

The subsequent full clinical trial of BrainGate was led by researchers at Massachusetts General Hospital, Brown University, and the United States Department of Veterans Affairs and ran from 2004 to 2006, involving the study of four patients with tetraplegia. The results, published in a 2006 article in the journal Nature, showed that a human with tetraplegia was able to control a cursor on a computer screen just by thinking, enabling him to open emails, and to operate devices such as a television. One participant, Matt Nagle, had a spinal cord injury, while another had advanced ALS.

In July 2009, a second clinical trial, dubbed "BrainGate2", was initiated by researchers at Massachusetts General Hospital, Brown University, and the Providence VA. In November 2011, researchers from the Stanford University Neural Prosthetics Translational Laboratory joined the trial as a second site. This trial is ongoing.

In May 2012, BrainGate researchers published a study in Nature demonstrating that two people paralyzed by brainstem stroke several years earlier were able to control robotic arms for reaching and grasping. One participant, Cathy Hutchinson, was able to use the arm to drink coffee from a bottle, the first time she was able to drink unaided in 15 years. This took place on site at The Boston Home in Dorchester, Massachusetts, a specialized residence where Ms. Hutchinson resided. The study included researchers at Brown University, the Department of Veterans Affairs, Massachusetts General Hospital, Harvard Medical School, and the German Aerospace Center.

=== Current clinical trials ===
Clinical trials began in 2009 under the name "BrainGate2 Neural Interface System". As of October 2014, Stanford University, Massachusetts General Hospital, Case Western Reserve University (Ohio) and Providence VA Medical Center were actively recruiting participants for the ongoing BrainGate2 clinical trial.

In April 2021, BrainGate became the first technology to transmit wireless commands from a human brain to a computer. The clinical study used two participants with spinal cord injuries. The study used a transmitter connected to the subject's brain motor cortex to transmit the signals. The accuracy and speed of typing and movement was reported to be identical to that of wired solutions.

== See also ==
- Brain–computer interface – Describes human trials with BrainGate
- Kernel (neurotech company)
- Neuralink
- Neurorobotics
