= Giles Brindley =

British physiologist (born 1926)

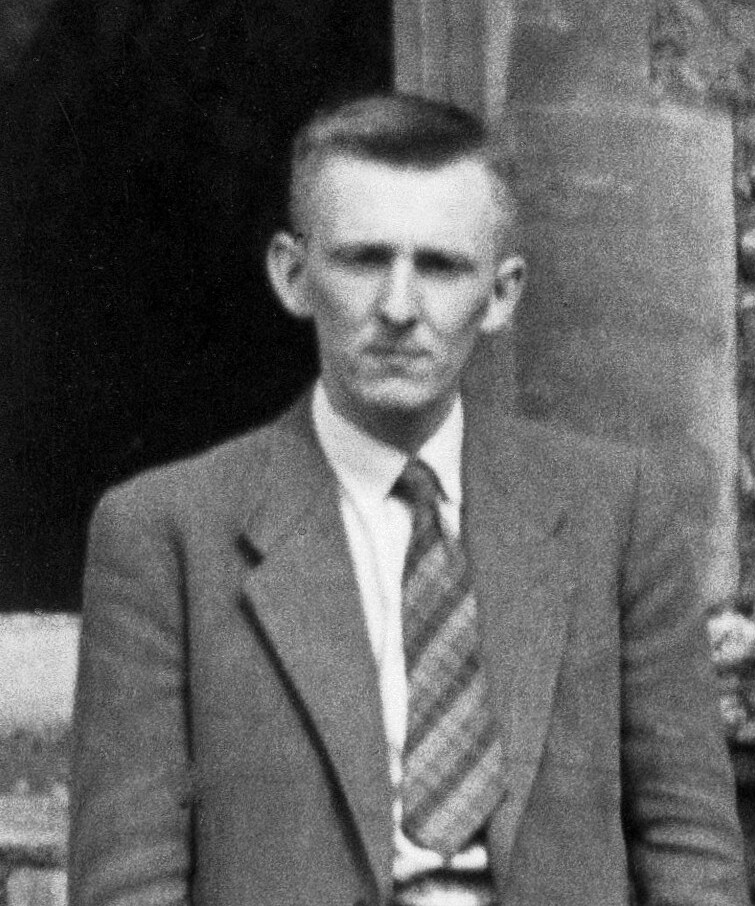
Giles Brindley (1952)

Giles Skey Brindley, FRS (born 30 April 1926) is a British physiologist, musicologist and composer, known for his contributions to the physiology of the retina and colour vision, and treatment of erectile dysfunction.

== Medical career ==
Brindley is an eccentric urologist in self-experimentation, perhaps best known for an unusual scientific presentation at the 1983 Las Vegas meeting of the American Urological Association, where he removed his pants to show the audience his chemically induced erection and invited them to inspect it closely. He had injected phenoxybenzamine (using one mL of a mixture of 5 mg of Phenoxybenzamine in 10 mL of saline) into his penis in his hotel room before the presentation.

Brindley is also a pioneer in visual prosthetics, developing one of the first visual prostheses in the 1960s. The device was tested on four blind patients, giving them some basic visual sensation, but given the technology of the day further development was impractical. He also developed sacral anterior root stimulators for bladder control in paraplegic patients.

Trained in Cambridge and London Hospital, he saw service in the RAF before taking up academic appointments first in Cambridge and then at the University of London, authoring more than 100 scientific papers in a variety of subjects. He was doctoral advisor to David Marr who later developed computational theories of vision that had great impact in the neuroscience of vision and computer vision, and post-doctoral adviser to Duco Hamasaki, a professor at the Bascom Palmer Eye Institute at the University of Miami School of Medicine.

Brindley was, for a while, a member of the Ratio Club with Alan Turing, Horace Barlow, John Westcott and others from various fields, who met between 1949 and 1952 to discuss brain mechanisms, new technology and related issues.

Brindley gave the 1986 Ferrier Lecture, a triennial Royal Society prize lectureship.

== Music ==
Brindley invented a musical instrument in the 1960s, the 'logical bassoon', an electronically controlled version of the bassoon. It was easier to play than a normal bassoon, but was never marketed.

Brindley also composed music for wind instruments, including Variations on a Theme by Schoenberg and The Watermans Daughter .

== Selected publications ==
- Physiology of the Retina and Visual Pathway. 2nd edition. Edward Arnold, London, 1970.
