= Single-unit recording =

Method to measure responses of a neuron

In neuroscience, single-unit recordings (also, single-neuron recordings) provide a method of measuring the electro-physiological responses of a single neuron using a microelectrode system. When a neuron generates an action potential, the signal propagates down the neuron as a current which flows in and out of the cell through excitable membrane regions in the soma and axon. A microelectrode is inserted into the brain, where it can record the rate of change in voltage with respect to time. These microelectrodes must be fine-tipped, impedance matching; they are primarily glass micro-pipettes, metal microelectrodes made of platinum, tungsten, iridium or even iridium oxide. Microelectrodes can be carefully placed close to the cell membrane, allowing the ability to record extracellularly.

Single-unit recordings are widely used in cognitive science, where it permits the analysis of human cognition and cortical mapping. This information can then be applied to brain–machine interface (BMI) technologies for brain control of external devices.

== Overview ==
There are many techniques available to record brain activity—including electroencephalography (EEG), magnetoencephalography (MEG), and functional magnetic resonance imaging (fMRI)—but these do not allow for single-neuron resolution. Neurons are the basic functional units in the brain; they transmit information through the body using electrical signals called action potentials. Currently, single-unit recordings provide the most precise recordings from a single neuron. A single unit is defined as a single, firing neuron whose spike potentials are distinctly isolated by a recording microelectrode.

The ability to record signals from neurons is centered around the electric current flow through the neuron. As an action potential propagates through the cell, the electric current flows in and out of the soma and axons at excitable membrane regions. This current creates a measurable, changing voltage potential within (and outside) the cell. This allows for two basic types of single-unit recordings. Intracellular single-unit recordings occur within the neuron and measure the voltage change (with respect to time) across the membrane during action potentials. This outputs as a trace with information on membrane resting potential, postsynaptic potentials and spikes through the soma (or axon). Alternatively, when the microelectrode is close to the cell surface extracellular recordings measure the voltage change (with respect to time) outside the cell, giving only spike information. Different types of microelectrodes can be used for single-unit recordings; they are typically high-impedance, fine-tipped and conductive. Fine tips allow for easy penetration without extensive damage to the cell, but they also correlate with high impedance. Additionally, electrical and/or ionic conductivity allow for recordings from both non-polarizable and polarizable electrodes. The two primary classes of electrodes are glass micropipettes and metal electrodes. Electrolyte-filled glass micropipettes are mainly used for intracellular single-unit recordings; metal electrodes (commonly made of stainless steel, platinum, tungsten or iridium) and used for both types of recordings.

Single-unit recordings have provided tools to explore the brain and apply this knowledge to current technologies. Cognitive scientists have used single-unit recordings in the brains of animals and humans to study behaviors and functions. Electrodes can also be inserted into the brain of epileptic patients to determine the position of epileptic foci. More recently, single-unit recordings have been used in brain machine interfaces (BMI). BMIs record brain signals and decode an intended response, which then controls the movement of an external device (such as a computer cursor or prosthetic limb).

== History ==
The ability to record from single units started with the discovery that the nervous system has electrical properties. Since then, single unit recordings have become an important method for understanding mechanisms and functions of the nervous system. Over the years, single unit recording continued to provide insight on topographical mapping of the cortex. Eventual development of microelectrode arrays allowed recording from multiple units at a time.

- 1790s: The first evidence of electrical activity in the nervous system was observed by Luigi Galvani in the 1790s with his studies on dissected frogs. He discovered that you can induce a dead frog leg to twitch with a spark.
- 1888: Santiago Ramón y Cajal, a Spanish neuroscientist, revolutionized neuroscience with his neuron theory, describing the structure of the nervous system and presence of basic functional units—neurons. He won the Nobel Prize in Physiology or Medicine for this work in 1906.
- 1928: One of the earliest accounts of being able to record from the nervous system was by Edgar Adrian in his 1928 publication "The Basis of Sensation". In this, he describes his recordings of electrical discharges in single nerve fibers using a Lippmann electrometer. He won the Nobel Prize in 1932 for his work revealing the function of neurons.
- 1940: Renshaw, Forbes & Morrison performed original studies recording discharge of pyramidal cells in the hippocampus using glass microelectrodes in cats.
- 1950: Woldring and Dirken report the ability to obtain spike activity from the surface of the cerebral cortex with platinum wires.
- 1952: Li and Jasper applied the Renshaw, Forbes, & Morrison method to study electrical activity in the cerebral cortex of a cat. Hodgkin–Huxley model was revealed, where they used a squid giant axon to determine the exact mechanism of action potentials.
- 1953: Iridium microelectrodes developed for recording.
- 1957: John Eccles used intracellular single-unit recording to study synaptic mechanisms in motoneurons (for which he won the Nobel Prize in 1963).
- 1958: Stainless steel microelectrodes developed for recording.
- 1959: Studies by David H. Hubel and Torsten Wiesel. They used single neuron recordings to map the visual cortex in unanesthesized, unrestrained cats using tungsten electrodes. This work won them the Nobel Prize in 1981 for information processing in the visual system.
- 1960: Glass-insulated platinum microelectrodes developed for recording.
- 1967: The first record of multi-electrode arrays for recording was published by Marg and Adams. They applied this method to record many units at a single time in a single patient for diagnostic and therapeutic brain surgery.
- 1978: Schmidt et al. implanted chronic recording micro-cortical electrodes into the cortex of monkeys and showed that they could teach them to control neuronal firing rates, a key step to the possibility of recording neuronal signals and using them for BMIs.
- 1981: Kruger and Bach assemble 30 individual microelectrodes in a 5x6 configuration and implant the electrodes for simultaneous recording of multiple units.
- 1992: Development of the "Utah Intracortical Electrode Array (UIEA), a multiple-electrode array which can access the columnar structure of the cerebral cortex for neurophysiological or neuroprosthetic applications".
- 1994: The Michigan array, a silicon planar electrode with multiple recording sites, was developed. NeuroNexus, a private neurotechnology company, is formed based on this technology.
- 1998: A key breakthrough for BMIs was achieved by Kennedy and Bakay with development of neurotrophic electrodes. In patients with amyotrophic lateral sclerosis (ALS), a neurological condition affecting the ability to control voluntary movement, they were able to successfully record action potentials using microelectrode arrays to control a computer cursor.

== Electrophysiology ==
The basis of single-unit recordings relies on the ability to record electrical signals from neurons.

=== Neuronal potentials and electrodes ===
When a microelectrode is inserted into an aqueous ionic solution, there is a tendency for cations and anions to react with the electrode creating an electrode-electrolyte interface. The forming of this layer has been termed the Helmholtz layer. A charge distribution occurs across the electrode, which creates a potential which can be measured against a reference electrode. The method of neuronal potential recording is dependent on the type of electrode used. Non-polarizable electrodes are reversible (ions in the solution are charged and discharged). This creates a current flowing through the electrode, allowing for voltage measurement through the electrode with respect to time. Typically, non-polarizable electrodes are glass micropipettes filled with an ionic solution or metal. Alternatively, ideal polarized electrodes do not have the transformation of ions; these are typically metal electrodes. Instead, the ions and electrons at the surface of the metal become polarized with respect to the potential of the solution. The charges orient at the interface to create an electric double layer; the metal then acts like a capacitor. The change in capacitance with respect to time can be measured and converted to voltage using a bridge circuit. Using this technique, when neurons fire an action potential they create changes in potential fields that can be recorded using microelectrodes. Single unit recordings from the cortical regions of rodent models have been shown to dependent on the depth at which the microelectrode sites were located. When comparing anesthetized vs. awake states, single unit activity in rodent models under 2% isoflurane has shown to lower the noise level in the neurological recordings; even though the awake state recordings showed a 14% increase in peak-to-peak voltage magnitude.

Intracellularly, the electrodes directly record the firing of action, resting and postsynaptic potentials. When a neuron fires, current flows in and out through excitable regions in the axons and cell body of the neuron. This creates potential fields around the neuron. An electrode near a neuron can detect these extracellular potential fields, creating a spike.

=== Experimental setup ===
The basic equipment needed to record single units is microelectrodes, amplifiers, micromanipulators and recording devices. The type of microelectrode used will depend on the application. The high resistance of these electrodes creates a problem during signal amplification. If it were connected to a conventional amplifier with low input resistance, there would be a large potential drop across the microelectrode and the amplifier would only measure a small portion of the true potential. To solve this problem, a cathode follower amplifier must be used as an impedance matching device to collect the voltage and feed it to a conventional amplifier. To record from a single neuron, micromanipulators must be used to precisely insert an electrode into the brain. This is especially important for intracellular single-unit recording.

Finally, the signals must be exported to a recording device. After amplification, signals are filtered with various techniques. They can be recorded by an oscilloscope and camera, but more modern techniques convert the signal with an analog-to-digital converter and output to a computer to be saved. Data-processing techniques can allow for separation and analysis of single units.

== Types of microelectrodes ==
There are two main types of microelectrodes used for single-unit recordings: glass micropipettes and metal electrodes. Both are high-impedance electrodes, but glass micropipettes are highly resistive and metal electrodes have frequency-dependent impedance. Glass micropipettes are ideal for resting- and action-potential measurement, while metal electrodes are best used for extracellular spike measurements. Each type has different properties and limitations, which can be beneficial in specific applications.

=== Glass micropipettes ===
Glass micropipettes are filled with an ionic solution to make them conductive; a silver-silver chloride (Ag-AgCl) electrode is dipped into the filling solution as an electrical terminal. Ideally, the ionic solutions should have ions similar to ionic species around the electrode; the concentration inside the electrode and surrounding fluid should be the same. Additionally, the diffusive characteristics of the different ions within the electrode should be similar. The ion must also be able to "provide current carrying capacity adequate for the needs of the experiment". And importantly, it must not cause biological changes in the cell it is recording from. Ag-AgCl electrodes are primarily used with a potassium chloride (KCl) solution. With Ag-AgCl electrodes, ions react with it to produce electrical gradients at the interface, creating a voltage change with respect to time. Electrically, glass microelectrode tips have high resistance and high capacitance. They have a tip size of approximately 0.5–1.5 μm with a resistance of about 10–50 MΩ. The small tips make it easy to penetrate the cell membrane with minimal damage for intracellular recordings. Micropipettes are ideal for measurement of resting membrane potentials and with some adjustments can record action potentials. There are some issues to consider when using glass micropipettes. To offset high resistance in glass micropipettes, a cathode follower must be used as the first-stage amplifier. Additionally, high capacitance develops across the glass and conducting solution which can attenuate high-frequency responses. There is also electrical interference inherent in these electrodes and amplifiers.

=== Metal ===
Metal electrodes are made of various types of metals, typically silicon, platinum, and tungsten. They "resemble a leaky electrolytic capacitor, having a very high low-frequency impedance and low high-frequency impedance". They are more suitable for measurement of extracellular action potentials, although glass micropipettes can also be used. Metal electrodes are beneficial in some cases because they have high signal-to-noise due to lower impedance for the frequency range of spike signals. They also have better mechanical stiffness for puncturing through brain tissue. Lastly, they are more easily fabricated into different tip shapes and sizes at large quantities. Platinum electrodes are platinum black plated and insulated with glass. "They normally give stable recordings, a high signal-to-noise ratio, good isolation, and they are quite rugged in the usual tip sizes". The only limitation is that the tips are very fine and fragile. Silicon electrodes are alloy electrodes doped with silicon and an insulating glass cover layer. Silicon technology provides better mechanical stiffness and is a good supporting carrier to allow for multiple recording sites on a single electrode. Tungsten electrodes are very rugged and provide very stable recordings. This allows manufacturing of tungsten electrodes with very small tips to isolate high-frequencies. Tungsten, however, is very noisy at low frequencies. In mammalian nervous system where there are fast signals, noise can be removed with a high-pass filter. Slow signals are lost if filtered so tungsten is not a good choice for recording these signals.

== Applications ==
Single-unit recordings have allowed the ability to monitor single-neuron activity. This has allowed researchers to discover the role of different parts of the brain in function and behavior. More recently, recording from single neurons can be used to engineer "mind-controlled" devices.

=== Cognitive science ===
Noninvasive tools to study the CNS have been developed to provide structural and functional information, but they do not provide very high resolution. To offset this problem invasive recording methods have been used. Single unit recording methods give high spatial and temporal resolution to allow for information assessing the relationship between brain structure, function, and behavior. By looking at brain activity at the neuron level, researchers can link brain activity to behavior and create neuronal maps describing flow of information through the brain. For example, Boraud et al. report the use of single unit recordings to determine the structural organization of the basal ganglia in patients with Parkinson's disease. Evoked potentials provide a method to couple behavior to brain function. By stimulating different responses, one can visualize what portion of the brain is activated. This method has been used to explore cognitive functions such as perception, memory, language, emotions, and motor control.

=== Brain–machine interfaces ===
Brain–machine interfaces (BMIs) have been developed within the last 20 years. By recording single unit potentials, these devices can decode signals through a computer and output this signal for control of an external device such as a computer cursor or prosthetic limb. BMIs have the potential to restore function in patients with paralysis or neurological disease. This technology has potential to reach a wide variety of patients but is not yet available clinically due to lack of reliability in recording signals over time. The primary hypothesis regarding this failure is that the chronic inflammatory response around the electrode causes neurodegeneration that reduces the number of neurons it is able to record from (Nicolelis, 2001). In 2004, the BrainGate pilot clinical trial was initiated to "test the safety and feasibility of a neural interface system based on an intracortical 100-electrode silicon recording array". This initiative has been successful in advancement of BCIs and in 2011, published data showing long term computer control in a patient with tetraplegia (Simeral, 2011).

== See also ==
- Brain–computer interface
- Brain implant
- BrainGate
- Chronic electrode implants
- Deep brain stimulation
- Electrical brain stimulation
- Electrocorticography
- Electroencephalography
- Electrophysiology
- Intracranial EEG
- Multielectrode array
- Patch clamp
- Responsive neurostimulation device
