= Paroxysmal depolarizing shift =

Manifestation of epilepsy in neurons

In neurology, a paroxysmal depolarizing shift (PDS) or depolarizing shift is the cellular correlate of Inter-ictal spiking ("inter" meaning between, and "ictal" meaning seizure) observed on Electroencephalography (EEG) between seizures in epileptic patients, and is a hallmark of cellular manifestation of epilepsy. Little is known about the initiation, propagation and termination of PDS, but insights into its behavior have been collected over years of research. PDSs are characterized by a large, prolonged positive shift in the electrical potential of a neuron's cell membrane, also called "depolarization". These depolarizations are large and persist long enough to produce bursts of action potentials in the neuron, followed by a period of "hyperpolarization", which silences the cell and prevents the generation of more action potentials until the next event. While single-cell PDS does not produce enough neuronal activity to produce Inter-ictal spiking, combined PDS generation from multiple cells can result in inter-ictal spikes, appearing as brief, abnormal discharges of electrical activity on EEGs. PDSs and inter-ictal spikes have been implicated in epileptic activity and can be used to locate epileptic focal points for surgical treatment options in pharmacologically resistant epileptic patients by localizing where the spikes are occurring to target specific areas of the brain.

== Electrophysiological Characteristics of PDS ==
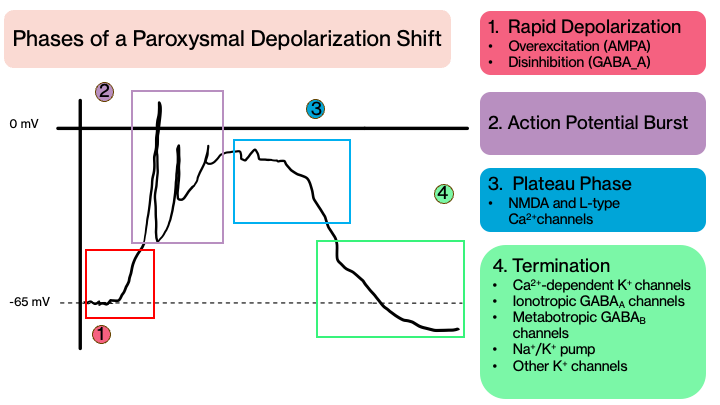
Phases of a Paroxysmal Depolarizing Shift (PDS) including (a) Rapid depolarization, (2) Action potential burst, (3) Depolarization plateau, and (4) Termination.

=== Initiation ===
Initiation of a PDS occurs when a giant excitatory postsynaptic potential (EPSP) drives the depolarization of the neuron. This initial depolarization is associated with ion channels that allow the influx of sodium, through AMPA receptor-mediated ion channels. It has been shown that inhibiting these channels with AMPA antagonists like CNQX suppresses PDS activity. This depolarization is increased substantially by disinhibition, a state in which inhibition of depolarization is blocked. In the case of PDS, disinhibition has been linked to the GABA_{A} receptor. It has also been shown that preventing the inhibition of depolarization by applying drugs like Penicillin or Bicuculline, which block inhibition by the GABA_{A}, induced PDS both in vivo and in vitro. Disinhibition or over-excitation, when occurring either individually or simultaneously, can lead to a summation of depolarizing stimuli and rapid "runaway" depolarization.

=== Plateau Phase ===
This initial depolarization can be followed by prolonged maintenance of the depolarized state, resulting in a "plateau" of potential on electrophysiological traces of changes in membrane potential as measured by patch clamp, whole-cell recording, or other methods. The plateau phase is a defining characteristic of PDS, and prolonged maintenance of the depolarizing plateau has been linked to increased production of inter-ictal spiking and seizure generation. The plateau potential of the PDS is maintained by a combination of synaptic potentials (EPSPsl, IPSPs) and ionic conductances (persistent sodium current and high-threshold calcium current) This calcium current has been connected with the activation of both NMDA receptor-mediated channels, as their magnesium block is released by depolarization, allowing calcium into the cell; and L-type calcium channels that are sensitive to states of high depolarization, allowing even more calcium into the cell.

=== Action Potential Bursts ===
As a result of the rapid depolarization past threshold potential, and the maintenance of the depolarization by the plateau phase, traces of PDS activity show bursts of action potentials, as expected from a neuron depolarized past threshold. These action potentials are intense, and occur frequently at first, but decrease in amplitude and temporal separation as the plateau persists.

=== Termination ===
Termination of a PDS involves many mechanisms, including calcium-dependent Potassium channels, ionotropic (voltage-sensitive) GABA_{A} receptors, metabotropic (ligand-activated) GABA_{B} receptors, the sodium–potassium pump, and other potassium channels, which serve to repolarize the membrane, shifting the potential in the negative direction. Termination may be followed by a period of hyperpolarization before returning to resting membrane potentia l.

Failure to terminate a PDS is associated with increased epileptogenesis and may be linked to seizure activity.

== Synaptic vs. Non-synaptic PDS Generation ==
In general, synaptic PDS could be initiated by EPSPs, and the plateau potential of the PDS is maintained by a combination of synaptic potentials (EPSPs, IPSPs) and ionic conductances (persistent sodium current and high-threshold calcium current) and the post-PDS hyperpolarization is governed by multiple potassium currents, activated by calcium or sodium entry, as well as by leak current. The next cycle of depolarization is initiated by both synaptic drive and the hyperpolarization-activated IH current.

In contrast, there lies non-synaptic mechanism of PDS. Unmasking persistent sodium current in presence of calcium channel blockers has been well studied. It is likely that calcium channel blockers will block voltage and ligand gated calcium channels, thereby affecting calcium-activated potassium channel in invertebrate model systems. The initiation of PDS without blocking any channel is much more prevalent in mammalian neurons, for example, thalamocortical neurons, CA3 pyramidal neurons, and some hypothalamic neurons. The possibility of spontaneous bursting in these neurons is implicated in regulating hormonal secretion. The significance of PDS may increase the signal-to-noise ratio, and play a vital role in information processing, synaptic plasticity. In contrast, the PDSs could be generated by electrical or chemical stimulation of single neurons.Depending on influx of ions, PDS can be theoretically categorized into two types. Ca^{2+} dependent PDS requires the entry of Ca^{2+} while Na^{+} dependent PDS is presumed to be non-synaptic.

The PDS found in invertebrates such as Helix, and higher vertebrates are assumed to be predominantly generated by activation of the AMPA receptor, subsequently leading to activation of the NMDA receptor. The evidence shows that there is a probable increase in intracellular calcium ions, which sustain calcium-dependent PDS. As usual, these Ca-ions will activate calcium dependent potassium channels and PDS will terminate. This is the case that provides a clue for synaptic transmission.. The amount of calcium entry through ion channels is critical in determining the physiological or pathological state of individual neurons,). For example, high concentration of calcium perturbs Ca-signalling cascades, leading to the death of neurons and circuits, while adequate amount of calcium will help in maintaining normal physiological function.

Alternatively the PDS can still occur and is less frequently studied by blocking calcium channels with heavy metals such as Ni^{2+}. Further evidence for Na^{+} dependent PDS is highlighted in leeches with the possibility of studying PDS in detail. It is likely that such type of PDS is sustained in the absence of Calcium, the case represents the non-synaptic nature of PDS. Finally, the Na/K pump and calcium activated potassium channel might play a role in terminating PDS. Paradoxically, there might arise the argument whether intracellular calcium could be able to repolarize the single neuron while blocking this calcium entry from the extracellular milieu. However, the other opportunity such as Na^{+}-Ca^{2+} exchange as well as small contribution from intracellular stores need to be explored.

If several million neurons discharge at once, it shows up on a scalp EEG as a focal interictal epileptiform spike. Paroxysmal depolarizing shifts can lead to an epileptic seizure if there is an underlying predisposition, and recording the spike can be an important aid in distinguishing seizure types.
