= Neurotrophic electrode =

Intracortical device designed to read the electrical signals of the brain

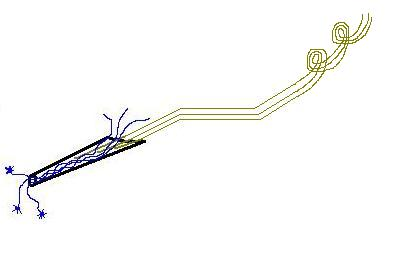
The neurotrophic electrode: teflon-coated gold wires extend from the back of the glass cone, while neurites (shown in blue) grow through it.

The neurotrophic electrode is an intracortical device designed to read the electrical signals that the brain uses to process information. It consists of a small, hollow glass cone attached to several electrically conductive gold wires. The term neurotrophic means "relating to the nutrition and maintenance of nerve tissue" and the device gets its name from the fact that it is coated with Matrigel and nerve growth factor to encourage the expansion of neurites through its tip. It was invented by neurologist Dr. Philip Kennedy and was successfully implanted for the first time in a human patient in 1996 by neurosurgeon Roy Bakay.

== Background ==
=== Motivation for development ===
Victims of locked-in syndrome are cognitively intact and aware of their surroundings, but cannot move or communicate due to near complete paralysis of voluntary muscles. In early attempts to return some degree of control to these patients, researchers used cortical signals obtained with electroencephalography (EEG) to drive a mouse cursor. However, EEG lacks the speed and precision that can be obtained by using a direct cortical interface.

Patients with other motor diseases, such as amyotrophic lateral sclerosis and cerebral palsy, as well as those who have suffered a severe stroke or spinal cord injury, also can benefit from implanted electrodes. Cortical signals can be used to control robotic limbs, so as the technology improves and the risks of the procedure are reduced, direct interfacing may even provide assistance for amputees.

=== Design development ===
When Dr. Kennedy was designing the electrode, he knew he needed a device that would be wireless, biologically compatible, and capable of chronic implantation. Initial studies with Rhesus monkeys and rats demonstrated that the neurotrophic electrode was capable of chronic implantation for as long as 14 months (human trials would later establish even greater robustness). This longevity was invaluable for the studies because while the monkeys were being trained at a task, neurons that were initially silent began firing as the task was learned, a phenomenon that would not have been observable if the electrode was not capable of long term implantation.

== Components ==
=== Glass cone ===
The glass cone is only 1–2 mm long, and is filled with trophic factors in order to encourage axons and dendrites to grow through its tip and hollow body. When the neurites reach the back end of the cone, they rejoin with the neuropil on that side, which anchors the glass cone in place. As a result, stable and robust long-term recording is attainable. The cone sits with its tip near layer five of the cortex, among corticospinal tract cell bodies, and is inserted at an angle of 45° from the surface, about 5 or 6 mm deep.

=== Gold wires ===
Three or four gold wires are glued to the inside of the glass cone and protrude out the back. They record the electrical activity of the axons that have grown through the cone, and are insulated with Teflon. The wires are coiled so as to relieve strain because they are embedded in the cortex on one end and attached to the amplifiers, which are fixed to the inside of the skull, on the other. Two wires are plugged into each amplifier to provide differential signalling.

=== Wireless transmitter ===
One of the greatest strengths of the neurotrophic electrode is its wireless capability, because without transdermal wiring, the risk of infection is significantly reduced. As neural signals are collected by the electrodes, they travel up the gold wires and through the cranium, where they are passed on to the bioamplifiers (usually implemented by differential amplifiers). The amplified signals are sent through a switch to a transmitter, where they are converted to FM signals and broadcast with an antenna. The amplifiers and the transmitters are powered by a 1 MHz induction signal that is rectified and filtered. The antenna, amplifiers, analog switches, and FM transmitters are all contained in a standard surface mount printed circuit board that sits just under the scalp. The whole ensemble is coated in protective gels, Parylene, Elvax, and Silastic, to make it biocompatible and to protect the electronics from fluids.

=== Data acquisition system ===
On the outside of the patient's scalp rests the corresponding induction coil and an antenna that sends the FM signal to the receiver. These devices are temporarily held in place with a water-soluble paste. The receiver demodulates the signal and sends it to the computer for spike sorting and data recording.

=== Assembly ===
Most of the neurotrophic electrode is made by hand. The gold wires are cut to the correct length, coiled, and then bent to an angle of 45° just above the point of contact with the cone in order to limit the implantation depth. One more bend in the opposite direction is added where the wires pass through the skull. The tips are stripped of their Teflon coating, and the ones farthest from the cone are soldered and then sealed with dental acrylic to a component connector. The glass cone is made by heating and pulling a glass rod to a point and then cutting the tip at the desired length. The other end is not a straight cut, but rather is carved at an angle to provide a shelf onto which the gold wires can be attached. The wires are then placed on the shelf and a methyl methacrylate gel glue is applied in several coats, with care taken to avoid covering the conductive tips. Lastly, the device is sterilized using glutaraldehyde gas at a low temperature, and aerated.

== Implementation ==
=== Computer cursor control ===
One of Dr. Kennedy's patients, Johnny Ray, was able to learn how to control a computer cursor with the neurotrophic electrode. Three distinct neural signals from the device were correlated with cursor movement along the x-axis, along the y-axis, and a "select" function, respectively. Movement in a given direction was triggered by an increase in neuron firing rate on the associated channel.

=== Speech synthesis ===
Neural signals elicited from another of Dr. Kennedy's patients have been used to formulate vowel sounds using a speech synthesizer in real time. The electronics setup was very similar to that used for the cursor, with the addition of a post-receiver neural decoder and the synthesizer itself. Researchers implanted the electrode in the area of the motor cortex associated with the movement of speech articulators because a pre-surgery fMRI scan indicated high activity there during a picture naming task. The average delay from neural firing to synthesizer output was 50 ms, which is approximately the same as the delay for an intact biological pathway.

== Comparison to other recording methods ==
The neurotrophic electrode, as described above, is a wireless device, and transmits its signals transcutaneously. In addition, it has demonstrated longevity of over four years in a human patient, because every component is completely biocompatible. Recent data from a locked-in person implanted for 13 years clearly show no scarring and many myelinated neurafilaments (axons)^{[12]} So the longevity question has been answered for the Neurotrophic Electrode. In comparison, the wire type electrodes (Utah array) lose signal over months and years: The Utah array loses 85% of its signals over 3 years^{[13]}, so it cannot be considered for long term human usage. The ECOG system loses signals in less than 2 years^{[14]}. Many emerging electrode types, such as those being developed by Neuralink, still suffer from similar problems. Data from metal electrodes, however, are very useful in the short term and have produced copious amounts of very useful data in the brain to computer research space.

The Neurotrophic Electrode was limited in the amount of information it could provide, however, because the electronics it used to transmit its signal required so much space on the scalp only four could fit on a human skull. This is becoming less of an issue over time as amplifier technology improves. Additionally, small electrode numbers have proven to still be useful. There are about 20 single unit per electrode, and recent results demonstrate one electrode with 23 single units could decode audible and silent speech, specifically phones, words and phrases^{[15]}.

Alternatively, the Utah array is currently a wired device, but transmits more information. It has been implanted in a human for over two years and consists of 100 conductive silicon needle-like electrodes, so it has high resolution and can record from many individual neurons. The Neurotrophic Electrode has high resolution also as evidenced by the importance of slow firing units that are generally dismissed by other groups^{[16]}.

In one experiment, Dr. Kennedy adapted the neurotrophic electrode to read local field potentials (LFPs). He demonstrated that they are capable of controlling assistive technology devices, suggesting that less invasive techniques can be used to restore functionality to locked-in patients. However, the study did not address the degree of control possible with LFPs or make a formal comparison between LFPs and single unit activity. It was the first study to show that LFPs could be used to control a device.

Electroencephalography (EEG) involves the placement of many surface electrodes on the patient's scalp, in an attempt to record the summed activity of tens of thousands to millions of neurons. EEG has the potential for long term use as a brain-computer interface, because the electrodes can be kept on the scalp indefinitely. The temporal and spatial resolutions and signal to noise ratios of EEG have always lagged behind those of comparable intracortical devices, but it has the advantage of not requiring surgery.

Electrocorticography (ECoG) records the cumulative activity of hundreds to thousands of neurons with a sheet of electrodes placed directly on the surface of the brain. In addition to requiring surgery and having low resolution, the ECoG device is wired, meaning the scalp cannot be completely closed, increasing the risk of infection. However, researchers investigating ECoG claim that the grid "possesses characteristics suitable for long term implantation". Their published data indicates loss of signal within two years^{[14]}.

== Drawbacks ==
=== Activation delay ===
The neurotrophic electrode is not active immediately after implantation because the axons must grow into the cone before the device can pick up electrical signals. Studies have shown that tissue growth is largely complete as early as one month after the procedure, but takes as many as four months to stabilize. A four month delay is not a disadvantage when considering the lifetime of the locked-in person who expects to move or speak again.

=== Surgery risks ===
The risks involved with the implantation are those that are usually associated with brain surgery, namely, the possibility of bleeding, infection, seizures, stroke, and brain damage. Until the technology advances to the point that these risks are considerably reduced, the procedure will be reserved for extreme or experimental cases. Only one of Neural Signals's six patients, Dr. Kennedy himself, had any complications. He experienced a short lived episode of focal motor seizures and brain swelling leading to temporary weakness on the contralateral side of the body.

=== Device failure ===
When Johnny Ray was implanted in 1998, one of the neurotrophic electrodes started providing an intermittent signal after it had become anchored in the neuropil, and as a result, Dr. Kennedy was forced to rely on the remaining devices. This was due to a problem with the electronics, NOT the electrode. Therefore, even if there is no complication from surgery, there is still a possibility that the electronics will fail. It is easy to change out the electronics. In addition, while the implants themselves are encased in the skull and are therefore relatively safe from physical damage, the electronics on the outside of the skull under the scalp are vulnerable. Two of Dr. Kennedy's patients accidentally caused damage during spasms, but in both cases only the external devices needed to be replaced.

== Future applications ==
=== Neuroprosthetics ===
As of November 2010, Dr. Kennedy is working on the speech synthesis application of the electrode, but has plans to expand its uses to many different areas, one of which is restoring movement with neuroprosthetics.

=== Silent speech ===
Silent speech is "speech processing in the absence of an intelligible acoustic signal" to be used primarily as an aid for the locked-in person. Silent speech has successfully been decoded^{[12]}. A secondary aim is to use audible or silent speech as a "cell phone under the scalp with the electrodes entering the speech motor cortex," i.e. as a consumer item. According to Phil Kennedy,

The reader may recoil at such an idea. But let me explain. Think of all the benefits of having a continuously accessible private cell phone in your body. To wit: “I need to contact so and so, I need to ask Siri a question, I need to access the cloud and receive information, I need to perform a calculation using access to the cloud, I need to use the Internet, I need to know what my stocks are doing, I need to know where my children are, I have fallen and need to contact EMS, and so on. I can text them or I can call them just with a thought, no need to find my phone and tap on it.” The cell phone under the scalp will bypass that step. It will provide continuous communication at will, and can be turned off as desired. Furthermore, it is worth recalling that history shows people will not shun devices that are imperceptible to them, that is, implanted under the skin or scalp. Consider how cardiac pacemakers were first rejected because they were bulky and had to be carried outside the body. Now they are totally implanted and routinely prescribed to patients. To my way of thinking, this uncomfortable development is also inevitable.

So my prediction is that from assisting people in need, we proceed to help people with a consumer product. Analogously, if the people in need are the tail of the dog (the whole dog being all humanity) then instead of the dog wagging the tail, the tail will wag the dog!
