= Mohamad Sawan =

Canadian engineer

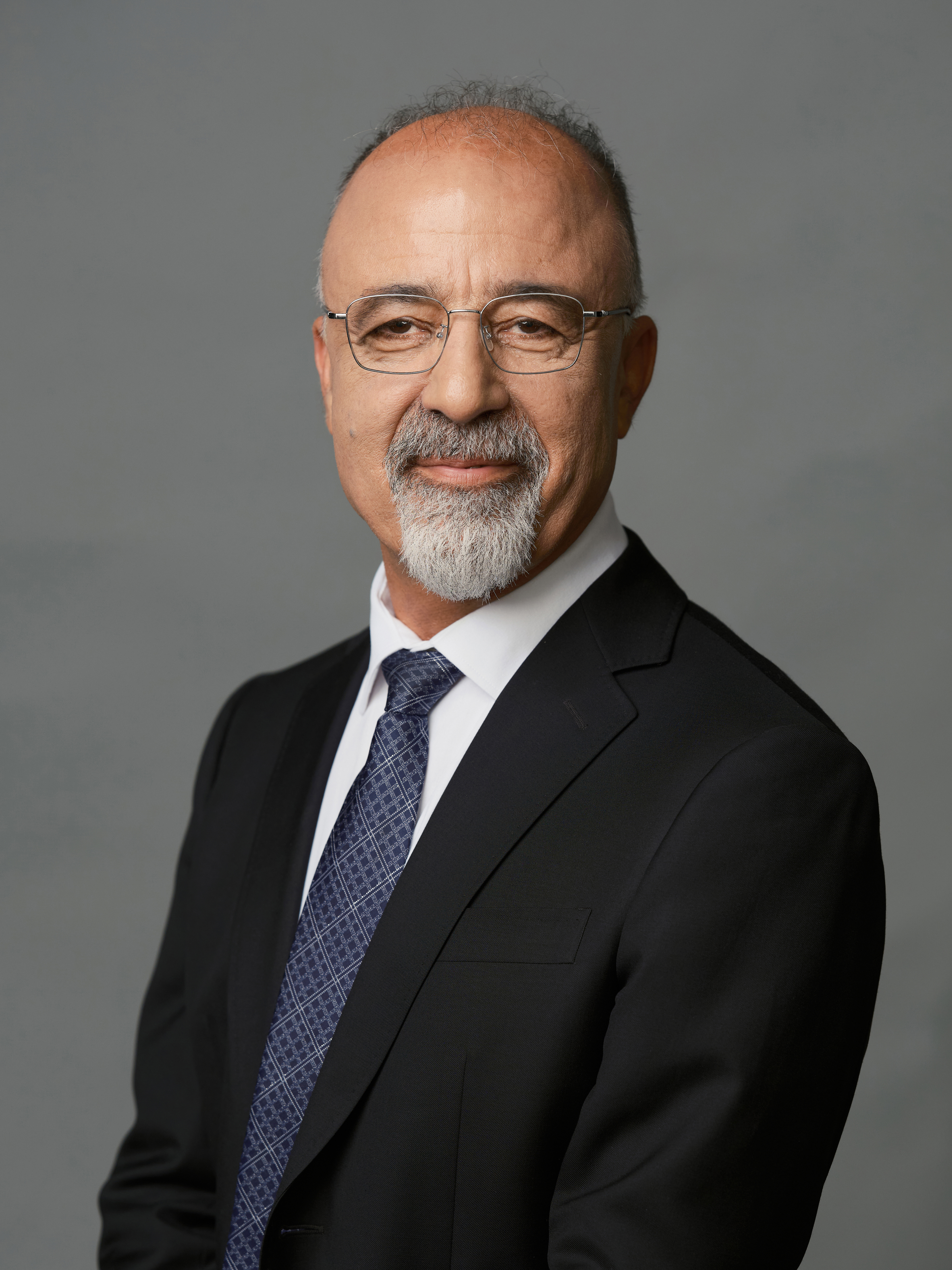
- Occupations: Electrical engineer, academic and researcher
- Awards: Fellow of the Canadian Academy of Engineering; Barbara Turnbull Award from the Canadian Institutes of Health Research; J.A. Bombardier Award for Research innovation and technology transfer Queen-Elizabeth II Diamond Jubilee Medal

Academic background
- Education: Bachelors; Master’s in Applied Sciences; Ph.D. in Microelectronics Biomedical
- Alma mater: Laval University, Canada; Université de Sherbrooke

Academic work
- Institutions: Polytechnique, Montréal, Canada; Westlake University, China
- Website: https://www.mohamadsawan.org/

Mohamad Sawan is a Canadian-Lebanese electrical engineer, academic and researcher. He is a Chair Professor at Westlake University, China, and an Emeritus Professor of Electrical Engineering at Polytechnique Montréal, Canada.

Sawan's research interests include designing and testing of mixed-signal circuits and systems, signal and image processing, medical devices including implantable sensors and microstimulators, ultrasound systems, and optical devices and integrated circuits and reprogrammable devices.

Sawan is a Fellow of the Canadian Academy of Engineering, the Institute of Electrical and Electronics Engineers, for contributions to implantable medical devices, and the Engineering Institute of Canada for contributions to Engineering practices. He was a member of the Biomedical Science and Technologies Research Centre (GRSTB) and the Institut de génie biomedical, both in Polytechnique Montréal. He is founder and director of the Cutting-Edge Net of Biomedical Research and Innovation (CenBRAIN) in Westlake University and of the Polystim Neurotechnologies Laboratory in Polytechnique Montréal

== Education ==
Sawan received his bachelor's degree from the Université Laval Canada in 1983. He got his master's degree in applied sciences in 1986 and his Ph.D. in microelectronics biomedical from Université de Sherbrooke Canada in 1990. He was a Post-Doctoral Fellow for Biomedical Engineering at McGill University till 1991.

== Career ==
Sawan started his academic career in 1991 as an assistant professor of electrical and computer engineering at the École Polytechnique till 1994, after which he was promoted to associate professor till 1998. He held a concurrent appointment as an adjunct professor of electrical engineering at McGill University from 1995 to 1998. In 1998, he was appointed as the professor of electrical engineering at Polytechnique Montreal, Canada. He serves as an adjunct professor at the School of Microelectronics, Shanghai University, China, and at Electrical & Computer Engineering, Laval University, Canada, since 2006 and 2011, respectively. At the School of Engineering in Westlake University China, he was appointed chair professor in 2019 and he is also an emeritus professor of electrical engineering since 2020 at Polytechnique.

Sawan led the Microsystems Strategic Alliance of Quebec (ReSMiQ) for more than 20 years. There are also several international conferences for which he is a founder and co-founder, including the IEEE NEWCAS, ICECS, and BioCAS. He is co-founder and was the editor-in-chief of the IEEE Transactions on Biomedical Circuits and Systems journal. He is the associate editor of the IEEE Transactions on Biomedical Engineering journal and the editor-in-chief of the Handbook of Biochips.

== Research ==
Sawan has his research spanned over several domains, but his main focus has been on system-on-chip (SoC) design and testing which includes analog, digital and RF circuits. He dedicated the early years of his research at Polytechnique to urinary implants, working on visual implants and artificial limbs.

=== Bioengineering ===
Sawan pioneered the process of designing, construction and packaging of implantable selective micro-stimulators and proposed integration of remote measurement techniques into one chip along with on-chip integrated electroneurogram measurement techniques to evaluate the volume of the bladder. He also discovered a way to address the design and analysis of a demodulator integrated in a CMOS chip, building on their previous research approach of a device that is implanted under the skin as a glucose sensor. Furthermore, he presented a prosthesis for patients who are visually impaired to help regain partial vision by microstimulation in the primary visual cortex area. The device is bio-electronic which is to be implanted under the skull of the user. For neural recordings from multiple channels, he developed a multichip structure including medical-grade stainless-steel and silicon-based microelectrode arrays.

Sawan helped design a low-power bioamplifier for massive integration in dense multichannel recording devices. Compared to previous designs, it has a reduced size because of active low-frequency suppression. Wireless power and bidirectional data transfer are required for biomedical implants. He showed that using a coplanar geometry approach is fitting for displacement tolerance as a continuation of previous work on novel topology for a multiple carrier inductive link. He also offered a theoretical analysis of the efficiency of power transfer and phase-shift-keying communications.

Sawan co-authored the books Implantable Microsystems for Brain-Machine Interfacing, that details the designing of electronic circuits and systems for implantable medical devices, and CMOS Capacitive Sensors for Lab-on-Chip Applications which discuses a multidisciplinary approach used for the miniaturization, integration and automation of biological assays or procedures in analytical chemistry.

=== Microelectronics ===
Sawan conducted an analysis of small-signal behavior of the neural amplifier and showed that the reduction of the input resistance of the operational transconductance amplifier is the main cause for the increase of the low-cutoff frequency in advanced CMOS technologies. In a paper, he presented a wireless power and downlink data transfer system for medical implants that is based on a Carrier Width Modulation scheme, operating over a single 10 MHz inductive link. A design for a standalone optical probe integrated with a Time-Gated Single Photon Detection module and Pulsed Light Emission unit is also presented which can detect photons in specific time windows, and even pick up on very faint optical signals. He also worked on an approach that can possibly forecast epileptic seizures using recurrent neural networks, with minimal feature extraction.

Sawan patented an invention that associates a method of adaptive predistortion and a device for power amplifiers for spectrally efficient microwave mobile communication equipments.

== Awards and honors ==
- 2001 – Fellow of the Canadian Academy of Engineering
- 2001 – 2015 – Tier 1 Canada Research Chair, Electrical Engineering, Polytechnique Montreal, Canada
- 2003 – Barbara Turnbull Award from the Canadian Institutes of Health Research (CIHR)
- 2004 – Fellow of the Institute of Electrical and Electronics Engineers
- 2005 – Medal of Honor from the president of Lebanon for outstanding achievements
- 2005 – J.A. Bombardier Award for research innovation and technology transfer, the ACFAS
- 2006 – Achievements Award, American University of Science and Technology
- 2007 – Fellow of the Engineering Institute of Canada for contributions to Engineering practices
- 2008 – Outstanding contributions, Officer of the National Order of Quebec
- 2009 – Excellence Award, the Society for Technology in Anesthesia
- 2012 – Jacques-Rousseau Award for Multidisciplinarity Research contributions, the ACFAS
- 2013 – Queen-Elizabeth II Diamond Jubilee Medal, the government of Canada
- 2014 – Research and Innovation Award, Polytechnique Montreal
- 2015 – Shanghai City Mayor Award for International Collaboration
- 2019 – Chinese Qianjiang Friendship Ambassador Award
- 2019 – Vice-President Publications of the IEEE Circuits & Systems Society
- 2021 – Chinese Zhejiang Westlake Friendship Award
- 2021 – Fellow of the Asia-Pacific Artificial Intelligence Association (AAIA)
- 2022 – Fellow of the Royal Society of Sciences of Canada (FRSC)

== Bibliography ==
=== Books ===
- Implantable Microsystems for Brain-Machine Interfacing (2014) 9781118353905
- CMOS Capacitive Sensors for Lab-on-Chip Applications (2010) 9789048137275
- Handbook of biochips: Integrated Circuits and Systems for Biology and Medicine (2022) 9781461435037

=== Selected articles ===
- Sawan, M., Hu, Y., & Coulombe, J. (2005). Wireless smart implants dedicated to multichannel monitoring and microstimulation. IEEE Circuits and systems magazine, 5(1), 21–39.
- Gosselin, B., Sawan, M., & Chapman, C. A. (2007). A low-power integrated bioamplifier with active low-frequency suppression. IEEE Transactions on biomedical circuits and systems, 1(3), 184–192.
- Assi, E. B., Gagliano, L., Rihana, S., Nguyen, D. K., & Sawan, M. (2018). Bispectrum features and multilayer perceptron classifier to enhance seizure prediction. Scientific reports, 8(1), 1–8.
- Nabovati, Ghazal; Ghafar-Zadeh, Ebrahim; Letourneau, Antoine; Sawan, Mohamad (April 2019). "Smart Cell Culture Monitoring and Drug Test Platform Using CMOS Capacitive Sensor Array". IEEE Transactions on Biomedical Engineering. 66 (4): 1094–1104. Bibcode:2019ITBE...66.1094N. doi:10.1109/TBME.2018.2866830. PMID 30139044.
- Salam, M. T., Sawan, M., & Nguyen, D. K. (2011). A novel low-power-implantable epileptic seizure-onset detector. IEEE Transactions on Biomedical Circuits and Systems, 5(6), 568-578.
- Coulombe, J., Sawan, M., & Gervais, J. F. (2007). A highly flexible system for microstimulation of the visual cortex: Design and implementation. IEEE transactions on biomedical circuits and systems, 1(4), 258–269.
