= Bioamplifier =

Electrophysiological device

A Bioamplifier is an electrophysiological device, a variation of the instrumentation amplifier, used to gather and increase the signal integrity of physiologic electrical activity for output to various sources. It may be an independent unit, or integrated into the electrodes.

== History ==
Efforts to amplify biosignals started with the development of electrocardiography. In 1887, Augustus Waller, a British physiologist, successfully measured the electrocardiograph of his dog using two buckets of saline, in which he submerged each of the front and the hind paws. A few months later, Waller successfully recorded the first human electrocardiography using the capillary electrometer. However, at the time of invention, Waller did not envision that electrocardiography would be used extensively in healthcare. The electrocardiograph was impractical to use until Willem Einthoven, a Dutch physiologist, innovated the use of the string galvanometer for cardiac signal amplification. Significant improvements in amplifier technologies led to the usage of smaller electrodes that were more easily attached to body parts. In the 1920s, a way to electrically amplify the cardiac signals using vacuum tubes was introduced, which quickly replaced the string galvanometer that amplified the signal mechanically. Vacuum tubes have a larger impedance, so the amplification was more robust. Also, its relatively small size compared to the string galvanometer contributed the widespread use of the vacuum tubes. Furthermore, the large metal buckets were no longer needed, as much smaller metal-plate electrodes were introduced. By the 1930s, electrocardiograph devices could be carried to the patient's home for the purpose of bedside monitoring. With the emergence of electronic amplification, it was quickly discovered that many features of the electrocardiography were revealed with various electrode placement.

== Variations ==
=== Electrocardiography ===
Electrocardiography (ECG or EKG) records the electrical activity of the heart, across the surface of the thorax skin. The signals are detected by electrodes attached to the surface of the skin and recorded by a device external to the body.

The amplitude of ECG ranges from 0.3 to 2 mV for the QRS complex, which is used to determine the interbeat interval from which the frequency is derived. The typical requirements for the amplifiers to be used in ECG include:

- Low internal noise (<2 mV)
- High Input Impedance (Z_{in} > 10 MΩ)
- Bandwidth ranging from 0.16–250 Hz
- Bandwidth cutoffs (>18 dB/octave).
- Notch filter (50 or 60 Hz, depending on country/region)
- Common mode rejection ratio (CMRR > 107 dB)
- Common mode input range (CMR ± 200 mV)
- Static electricity shock protection (>2000 V).

=== Electromyography ===
Electromyography (EMG) records the electrical activity produced by skeletal muscles. It records various types of muscle signals from simple relaxation by using placing electrodes on the subject's forehead, to complex neuromuscular feedback during stroke rehabilitation. The EMG signals are acquired from the electrodes applied over or nearby the muscles to be monitored. The electrodes delegates signals to the amplifier unit, usually consisting of high performance differential amplifiers. The usual types of the signal of the interest are in the range of 0.1–2000 mV amplitude, over a bandwidth of about 25–500 Hz.

Although many electrodes still connect to an amplifier using wires, some amplifiers are small enough to mount directly on the electrode. Some minimal specifications for a modern EMG amplifier includes:

- Low internal noise (<0.5 mV)
- High input impedance (>100 MΩ)
- Flat bandwidth and sharp high and low frequency cutoffs (>18 dB/octave).
- High common mode rejection ratio (CMRR > 10^{7} dB)
- Common mode input range (CMR > ±200 mV)
- Static electricity shock protection (>2000 V)
- Gain stability > ±1%

=== Electroencephalography ===
Electroencephalography (EEG) instrumentation is similar to EMG instrumentation in terms of involving the placement of many surface electrodes on the patient's skin, specifically, on scalp. While EMG acquires the signals from muscles below the skin, EEG attempts to acquire signals on the patient's scalp, generated by brain cells. Simultaneously, EEG records the summed activity of tens of thousands to millions of neurons. As the amplifiers became small enough to integrate with the electrodes, EEG has become to have the potential for long term use as a brain–computer interface, because the electrodes can be kept on the scalp indefinitely. The temporal and spatial resolutions and signal to noise ratios of EEG have always lagged behind those of comparable intracortical devices, but it has the advantage of not requiring surgery.

High performance differential amplifiers are used for amplification. Signals of interest are in the range of 10 μV to 100 μV, over the frequency range of 1–50 Hz. Similar to EMG amplifiers, EEG benefits from the usage of integrated circuit. The chances of EEG is also mainly from the asymmetrical placement of electrodes, which leads to increased noise or offset. Some minimal specifications for a modern EEG amplifier includes:

- Low internal voltage and current noise(<1 mV, 100 pA)
- High input impedance (>10^{8} MΩ)
- Bandwidth (1–50 Hz)
- Frequency cutoffs (>18 dB/octave)
- High common mode rejection ratio (>10^{7})
- Common mode input range (greater than ±200 mV).
- Static electricity shock protection (>2000 V)
- Gain stability > ±1%

=== Galvanic skin response ===
Galvanic skin response is a measurement of the electrical conductance of the skin, which is directly influenced by how much the skin is moist. Since the sweat glands are controlled by the sympathetic nervous system, the skin conductance is crucial in measuring the psychological or physiological arousal. The arousal and the eccrine sweat gland activity are clinically found to have direct relation. High skin conductance due to sweating can be used to predict that the subject is in a highly aroused state, either psychologically or physiologically, or both.

Galvanic skin response can be measured either as resistance, called skin resistance activity (SRA) or skin conductance activity (SCA), which is a reciprocal of SRA. Both SRA and SCA include two types of responses: the average level and the short-term phasic response. Most modern instruments measure conductance, although they both can be displayed with the conversion made in circuitry or software.

=== Other ===
Electrocorticography (ECoG) records the cumulative activity of hundreds to thousands of neurons with a sheet of electrodes placed directly on the surface of the brain. In addition to requiring surgery and having low resolution, the ECoG device is wired, meaning the scalp cannot be completely closed, increasing the risk of infection. However, researchers investigating ECoG claim that the grid "possesses characteristics suitable for long term implantation".

The neurotrophic electrode is a wireless device that transmits its signals transcutaneously. In addition, it has demonstrated longevity of over four years in a human patient, because every component is completely biocompatible. It is limited in the amount of information it can provide, however, because the electronics it uses to transmit its signal (based around differential amplifiers) require so much space on the scalp that only four can fit on a human skull.

In one experiment, Dr. Kennedy adapted the neurotrophic electrode to read local field potentials (LFPs). He demonstrated that they are capable of controlling assistive technology devices, suggesting that less invasive techniques can be used to restore functionality to locked-in patients. However, the study did not address the degree of control possible with LFPs or make a formal comparison between LFPs and single unit activity.

Alternatively, the Utah array is currently a wired device, but transmits more information. It has been implanted in a human for over two years and consists of 100 conductive silicon needle-like electrodes, so it has high resolution and can record from many individual neurons.

== Design ==
=== Acquiring signals ===
Nowadays, mostly digital amplifiers are used to record biosignals. The amplification process does not only depend on the performance and specifications of the amplifier device, but also closely binds to the types of electrodes to attach on the subject's body. Types of electrode materials and the mount position of electrodes affect the acquirement of the signals. Multielectrode arrays are also used, in which multiple electrodes are arranged in an array.

Electrodes made with certain materials tend to perform better by increasing surface area of the electrodes. For instance, Indium tin oxide (ITO) electrodes have less surface area than those made with other materials, like titanium nitride. More surface area results in reducing impedance of electrode, then neurons signals are obtained easier. ITO electrodes tend to be flat with a relatively small surface area, and are often electroplated with platinum to increase surface area and improve signal-to-area ratio.

Digital amplifiers and filters are produced small enough nowadays to be combined with electrodes, serving as preamplifiers. The need for preamplifiers is clear in that the signals that neurons (or any other organs) produce are weak. Therefore, preamplifiers preferably are to be placed near the source of the signals, where the electrodes are adjacent to. Another advantage for having preamplifiers close to the signal source is that the long wires lead to significant interference or noise. Therefore, it is best to have the wires as short as possible.

However, when wider bands are needed, for instance a very high (action potentials) or a low frequency (local field potentials), they could be filtered digitally, perhaps with second-stage analog amplifier before being digitized. There may be some drawbacks when several amplifiers in cascade. It depends on the type, analog or digital. However, in general, filters cause time-delay and amendments are needed to have signals in sync. Also, as extra complexity is added, it costs more money. In terms of digital amplifiers, a lot of works that the laboratories do are feeding back signals to the networks in closed loop, real-time. As a result, more time is needed to apply on signals when there are more digital amplifiers on the way. One solution is using field-programmable gate array (FPGA), the "blank slate" integrated circuit that is written whatever on it. Using FPGA sometimes reduces a need to use computers, resulting in a speed-up of filtering. Another problem with cascaded filters occurs when the maximum output of the first filter is smaller than the raw signals, and the second filter has a higher maximum output that the first filter. In that case, it is impossible to recognize if the signals have reached the maximum output or not.

=== Design challenges ===
The trend with the development in electrodes and amplifiers has been reducing its size for better transportability, as well as making them implantable on the skin for prolonged recording of the signals. Preamplifiers, head-stage amplifiers stay the same except that they should have different form-factors. They should be lightweight, waterproof, not scratching skin or scalp from parts that they need to mount themselves, and they should dissipate heat well. Heat dissipation is a big issue, because extra heat may cause in the temperature of nearby tissue to rise, potentially causing a change in the physiology of the tissue. One of the solutions to dissipate heat is the usage of the Peltier device. Peltier device, uses Peltier effect or thermoelectric effect to create a heat flux between the two different types of materials. A Peltier device actively pumps the heat from one side to the other side of the device, consuming electrical energy. Conventional cooling using compressed gases would not be a feasible option for cooling down an individual integrated circuit, because it needs many other devices to operate such as evaporator, compressor and condenser. Overall, a compressor-based system is more for a large-scale cooling jobs, and is not viable for small-scale system like bioamplifiers. The passive cooling, like heat sink and fan, only limits the rise of temperature above the ambient condition, while Peltier devices can actively pull heat right out of a thermal load, just like compressor-based cooling systems. Also, Peltier devices can be manufactured at sizes well below 8 mm square, therefore they can be integrated to the bioamplifiers without making them to lose mobility.

== See also ==
- Amplifier
- Biosignal
- Operational amplifier applications
