= Cortical stimulation mapping =

- Purpose: aims to localize the function of specific brain regions

Cortical stimulation mapping (CSM) is a type of electrocorticography that involves a physically invasive procedure and aims to localize the function of specific brain regions through direct electrical stimulation of the cerebral cortex. It remains one of the earliest methods of analyzing the brain and has allowed researchers to study the relationship between cortical structure and systemic function. Cortical stimulation mapping is used for a number of clinical and therapeutic applications, and remains the preferred method for the pre-surgical mapping of the motor cortex and language areas to prevent unnecessary functional damage. There are also some clinical applications for cortical stimulation mapping, such as the treatment of epilepsy.

== History ==
The history of cortical stimulation mapping dates back to the late 19th century. Neurologist David Ferrier and neurosurgeon Victor Horsley were some of the first to utilize this technique. Ferrier and Horsley employed CSM to further grasp the structure and function of the pre-Rolandic and post-Rolandic areas, also known as the pre central gyrus and post central gyrus. Prior to the development of more advanced methods, in 1888 C.B. Nancrede utilized a battery operated bipolar probe in order to map the motor cortex. In 1937, Wilder Penfield and Boldrey were able to show that stimulating the precentral gyrus elicited a response contralaterally; a significant finding given that it correlated to the anatomy based on which part of the brain was stimulated. In the early 1900s Charles Sherrington began to use monopolar stimulation in order to elicit a motor response. This technique allowed Sherrington to determine that the precentral gyrus (pre-Rolandic area) is a motor cortex and the postcentral gyrus (post-Rolandic area) is a sensory cortex. These findings, which were repeated by Harvey Cushing through the early 1900s, show that the Rolandic fissure is the point of separation between the motor and sensory cortices. Cushing's work with CSM moved it from an experimental technique to one that became a staple neurosurgery technique used to map the brain and treat epilepsy. Cushing took work that had previously been done on animals, specifically chimpanzees and orangutans, and was able to utilize cortical stimulation mapping to account for the differences between these species and humans. Cushing's work dramatically increased the effectiveness of the treatment utilizing cortical stimulation mapping, as neurosurgeons were now utilizing a more updated picture of the brain.

== Procedure ==
Cortical stimulation mapping is an invasive procedure that has to be completed during a craniotomy. Once the dura mater is peeled back, an electrode is placed on the brain to test motor, sensory, language, or visual function at a specific brain site. The electrode delivers an electric current lasting from 2 to 10 seconds on the surface of the brain, causing a reversible lesion in a particular brain location. This lesion can prevent or produce a testable response, such as the movement of a limb or the ability to identify an object. The electric current from the electrode stimulates whatever function that site in the brain is responsible for, in essence telling the surgeon or examiner what a specific locale in the brain does.

Electrodes are usually made of stainless steel or platinum-iridium embedded in a silastic material, and are usually circular with diameters of 2 to 3 mm. Electrode positioning varies from patient to patient, and electrodes can come in rows, in a grid array, or can be individually arranged. The number of electrodes necessary and their exact spatial arrangement is often determined in the operating room. Cortical stimulation mapping allows electrodes to be placed in exact locations to test brain function and identify if stimulation of the brain location causes a functional impairment in the patient. CSM can be completed using anesthetized patients or awake patients.

Electrodes can either be placed directly on brain areas of interest or can be placed in the subdural space of the brain. Subdural electrodes can shift slightly and can be affected by cerebrospinal fluid in the subdural space, which could interfere with the current used to stimulate the brain from the electrodes and possibly cause shunting and dissipate the current, making the stimulation's effect less accurate. However, an advantage of subdural electrode grids is that they can be left in the brain for multiple days, and allow functional testing during stimulation outside the operating room.

Current levels and density are an important consideration in all cortical stimulation mapping procedures. Current density, that is the amount of current applied to a defined area of the brain, must be sufficient to stimulate neurons effectively and not die off too quickly, yet low enough to protect brain tissue from damaging currents. Currents are kept at levels that have been determined safe and are only given as short bursts, typically bursts that slowly increase in intensity and duration until a response (such as a muscle movement) can be tested. Current intensity is usually set around bursts of 1 mA to begin and gradually increased by increments of 0.5 to 1 mA, and the current is applied for a few seconds. If the current applied causes afterdischarges, nerve impulses that occur after stimulation, then the levels are lowered. Studies on patients who have received cortical stimulation mapping have found no cortical damage in the tested areas.

The different types and administration techniques for anesthesia have been shown to affect cortical stimulation mapping. CSM can be done performed on awake patients, called an awake craniotomy or in patients who have been placed under general anesthesia. If the patient is under general anesthesia, the depth of the anesthesia can affect the outcome because if the levels of muscle relaxation are too high due to neuromuscular blocking drugs, then the results from the mapping can be incorrect. For the awake procedure there are different considerations for patient care that the anesthesiologist must take into account. Rather than simply ensuring that the patient is asleep, the doctor can follow what is called the asleep-awake-asleep technique. In this technique the patient is anesthetized using a general anesthesia during the opening and closing portions of the procedure, but during the interim the patient is maintained utilizing local anesthesia. The local anesthesia techniques can be either a local field block or a regional nerve block of the scalp. The more common technique for the awake craniotomy is conscious sedation. In conscious sedation, the patient is only sedated during the opening and closing process, but never fully anesthetized, eliminating the need for breathing tubes, lessening the chances of complications, and lessening the chances of problems with motor response. Patients who undergo the procedure with an awake craniotomy instead of general anesthesia have better preservation of language function, a prediction of their seizure-free outcome based on corticography, a shorter hospitalization (which corresponds to a reduced cost of care), a decreased usage of invasive monitors, and decreased number of postoperative complications due to anesthesia such as nausea and vomiting.

== Somatotopy ==
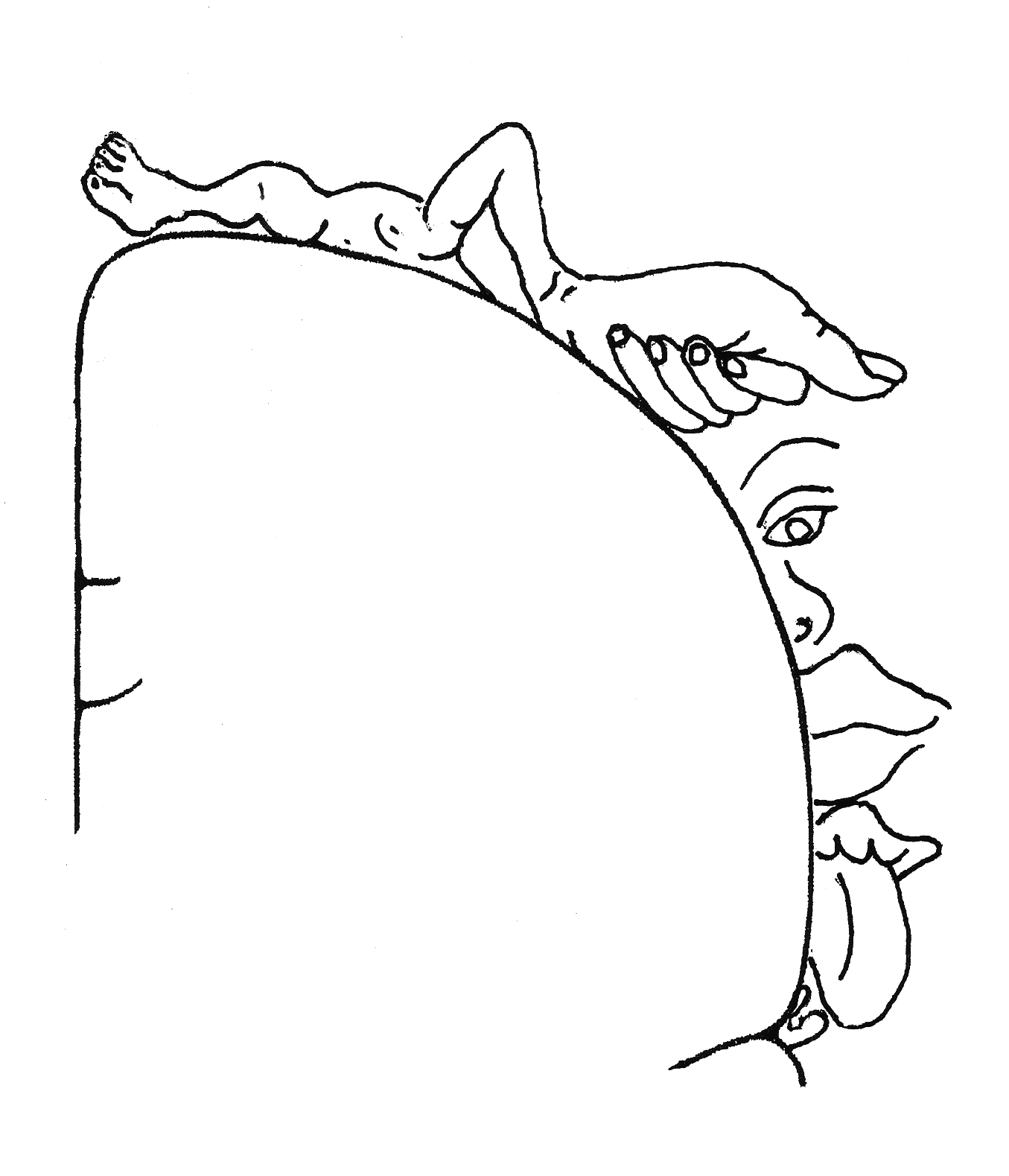
The idea of the cortical homunculus was created by Wilder Penfield.

Cortical stimulation mapping is used for somatotopy to determine the areas of the cerebral cortex that connect through nerve fibers with different body parts. Cortical stimulation identifies which regions of the brain are vital for certain functions, thereby allowing a 'map' to be made which can be used to decide if brain areas are safe to remove. Cortical stimulation mapping led to the development of a homunculus for the motor and sensory cortices, which is a diagram showing the brain's connections to different areas of the body. An example is the cortical homunculus of the primary motor cortex and the somatosensory cortex, which are separated by the central sulcus. The diagram starts in the longitudinal fissure and continues out laterally from the center of the brain, representing the general pattern from lower extremities and genitals in the fissure up to the hands and face on outer edges of the brain.

=== Motor Mapping ===
Functional testing of movement during cortical stimulation includes looking for active movement and inhibition of movement. When the precentral gyrus of the frontal lobe is stimulated, specific muscles in the body will contract based on the location of the brain that receives the electric signal. Stimulation on one side of the brain will cause a contraction on the contralateral, or opposite, side of the body.

More recent studies using CSM have shown that the motor cortex is more complex than the arrangement pictured traditional homunculus, and that motor responses occur in the frontal lobe further away from the narrow strip next to the central sulcus.

Areas of the cortex that inhibit movement upon stimulation have been found in some cases to be supplemental and not vital to motor function. These areas have been removed without compromising a patient's ability to move post-operation.

=== Language Mapping ===
During stimulation various language tasks are used to check brain function such as reading sentences, auditory comprehension, and spontaneous speech such as naming objects. Cortical stimulation in language areas of the brain typically tests for the inhibition of some language capability, rather than a defined motor or sensory response. This can make language mapping require more complex language-related tasks to be assessed during testing, in order to determine if the site that is stimulated is essential to a certain language ability.

Language mapping is normally done in the left hemisphere of the brain where most language areas are located, such as Broca's and Wernicke's areas. Cortical stimulation mapping has also identified a language area in the basal temporal cortex that was previously unknown.

Cortical stimulation mapping in patients with epilepsy has shown that critical language areas of the brain vary greatly in patients, highlighting the need to perform accurate mapping prior to surgeries in language areas. Traditional landmarks such as Broca's and Wernicke's areas cannot be relied on to distinguish essential language cortex. Rather, experiments that have tested for vital language sites are variable, and the exact role of a specific cortex area in a language task is difficult to judge. A further complication is that many patients who have undergone language mapping have epilepsy, which often alters the localization of cortical areas due to the neuroplastic response to cortical insult caused by the patient's seizures. Since the procedure is so invasive, cortical stimulation mapping for language organization is not done on healthy individuals. Additionally the distribution and abundance of specific task-related language sites have shown variation based on IQ and gender.

=== Somatosensory mapping ===
Somatosensory mapping involves measuring electrical responses on the surface of the brain as the result of the stimulation of peripheral nerves, such as mechanoreceptors that respond to pressure on the skin, and stimulating the brain directly to map sensory areas. Sensation has been tested in patients through the stimulation of the postcentral gyrus, with a drop in amplitude of sensory responses occurring towards the central sulcus.

== Clinical Applications ==
=== Epilepsy ===
CSM is an effective treatment for focal epilepsy and bilateral or multiple seizure foci. It is an effective treatment option when resective surgery to remove the affected area is not an option, generally seen with bilateral or multiple seizure foci. CSM is routinely utilized for patients with epilepsy in order to pin point the focal point of the seizures. It is used once there is a testable hypothesis regarding brain location for the epileptogenic zone, determined through a less invasive procedure, electroencephalography. Once the focal point of the seizures is determined, this information allows aids neurosurgeons with knowing what portions of the brain could potentially be resected without any negative post-operative neurological deficits.

CSM will be considered for a patient with epilepsy when two conditions are met: the trial of anti-epileptic drugs has not controlled seizures and there is a likelihood that the surgery will benefit the patient. Due to the nature of the procedure, CSM is only utilized after noninvasive procedures have not been able to fully localize and treat the patient.

The invasive electrodes are stereotaxically placed electrodes or a subdural strip or grid electrode. Utilizing the information obtained through CSM, limited resection of epileptogenic brain can be performed. For focal epilepsy, resective surgery is one of the mainstay treatment options for medication resistant epilepsy. Through the technique of CSM, generally using awake craniotomies, the neurosurgeon has the ability to monitor the functioning of the patient during the resection and stimulation of the brain.

=== Neuro-Oncology ===
Cortical stimulation mapping may be used in neuro-oncology as a tool to identify the areas of a patient's brain that are critical for functions such as the language and motor pathways. This procedure is considered standard for operations involving gliomas in order to reduce loss of motor function and overall morbidity. Pre-surgical planning allows for the physician to avoid these high-risk areas as much as possible during a tumor resection, minimizing potential loss of function and development of sequelae.

Patients whose surgeon uses cortical stimulation mapping to assess the anatomy and function of rolandic areas have a greater chance and faster rate of regaining baseline function post-operatively than those who undergo surgeries that avoid this technique. The same may be said for the benefits of mapping language areas with the cortical stimulation technique before a glioma resection. Assessing and minimizing the damage of operating on language-involved regions leads to the greater and faster return of overall language function.

Despite the functional gain from preserving these eloquent cortical areas, benefit-to-risk factors are still considered. More complete tumor resection has been shown to possibly expand the life expectancy of glioma patients; however, increasing the amount of brain tissue removed may also cause a debilitating decrease in function. As such, cortical stimulation mapping aids in determining the maximum amount of tissue that can be removed while still maintaining the patient's quality of life.

=== Vision ===
Mapping of the occipital cortex has possible use in the development of a prosthesis for the blind. Electrical stimulation in the occipital lobe has been found to cause visual illusions called phosphenes such as light, colors, or shadows, which were observed in the early experiments of Penfield and Jasper . The first recorded production of artificial sight was in experiments done by Brindley and Dobelle, where they were able to allow blind patients to 'see' small characters through cortical stimulation. Electrical stimulation in the occipital lobe has also been known to produce small colored circles usually in the center of the patient's field of vision. Visual hallucinations, such as moving geometric patterns and moving colored phosphenes have also been observed with cortical stimulation. Electrodes at the occipital cortex surface tend to produce flickering phosphenes, while electrodes inserted deeper within the cortex produce steady colors. The primary visual cortex, which is responsible for generating more complex images, is located deeper within the calcarine fissure of the occipital lobe, so intracortical stimulation is needed to stimulate these areas effectively. Intracortical stimulation uses an electrode that goes deeper into the brain to more effectively stimulate the primary visual cortex, as opposed to trying to work only from the surface of the brain, which can cause unintended visual signals, pain, and damage to the nervous tissue.

For patients with glaucoma and optic nerve atrophy, existing retinal prostheses are not an option since the optic nerve is damaged, therefore a prosthesis using cortical stimulation is a remaining hope to offer some vision function. A cortical visual prosthesis is a promising subject of research because it targets neurons past the site of disease in most blind patients. However, significant challenges remain such as reproducibility in different patients, long-term effects of electrical stimulation, and the higher complexity of visual organization in the primary visual cortex versus that in the retina.

Another site of research for a vision prosthesis using cortical stimulation is the optic nerve itself, which contains the nerve fibers responsible for the complete visual field. Research is still ongoing in this area and the small size of the optic nerve and the high density of nerve fibers are continuing challenges to this approach

=== Cortical stimulation mapping vs. transcranial magnetic stimulation ===
Cortical stimulation mapping (CSM) is considered the gold standard for mapping functional regions of the brain to create a presurgical plan that maximizes the patient's functional outcome. The history of beneficial outcomes and the amount of information already established about the CSM technique makes it advantageous in clinical and research applications. However, because it has the drawback of being an intraoperative technique, there is growing debate about its status as the preferred method. Instead, transcranial magnetic stimulation (TMS), a new procedure that does not carry the same amount of surgical risk, is being considered.

Transcranial magnetic stimulation has been gaining increasing interest as an alternative tool for studying the relationships between specific cortical areas and brain function, particularly because its non-invasive nature is advantageous over CSM. Additionally, because of the increasing body of research focused on investigating the many medical uses of TMS, it could eventually have more applications than CSM. For example, this procedure been successfully used to measure the speed of conduction in central motor pathways, making it a useful tool for those studying multiple sclerosis. Similarly, TMS is also being researched for its possibilities as a long-term and possibly more cost-effective therapeutic alternative for treating chronic psychiatric disorders such as major depression as well as its use as a means of in aiding in stroke recovery. However, although therapeutic TMS is promising overall, its success is still unclear and has not been upheld in a number of studies. This is true relating to studies of Parkinson's patients who were given long-term TMS therapy. Although it initially appeared as if these subjects gained improved performance in motor coordination tests, these results are inconsistently reproducible. The same type of results are seen in studies in schizophrenia where it has been shown that cognitive performance in schizophrenic patients treated with TMS is highly variable. Such results suggest that evidence of the effects of TMS are lacking and this technique's neurobiological mechanisms are still not well understood. Because of these uncertainties, research on this method is ongoing and much is still to be determined about its exact effect on the activation state of the brain. Comparatively, CSM, having the advantages of the more researched technique, is often still preferred.

Safety must also be considered with respect to both methods. So far, Food and Drug Administration (FDA) guidelines have only approved the use of TMS for the treatment of depression. Although this technique has no known lasting side effects except for a few reported cases of induced seizures, it is still treated with caution due to its relative novelty in clinical use. CSM has gained U.S. FDA approval for its uses regarding cortical stimulation mapping, especially in cases of seizure and glioma treatments, and for aiding in the placement of electrodes within the brain.
