= Postictal state =

Altered state of consciousness after an epileptic seizure

The postictal state is the altered state of consciousness after an epileptic seizure. It usually lasts between 5 and 30 minutes, but sometimes longer in the case of larger or more severe seizures, and is characterized by drowsiness, confusion, nausea, hypertension, headache or migraine, and other disorienting symptoms.

The ictal period is the seizure itself; the interictal period is the time between seizures, when brain activity is more normal; and the preictal period is the time leading up to a seizure:

- Pre-ictal refers to the state immediately before the actual seizure, stroke, or headache.
- Ictal period refers to a physiologic state or event such as a seizure, stroke, or headache. The word originates from the Latin word ictus, meaning a blow or a stroke. In electroencephalography (EEG), the recording during a seizure is said to be "ictal". The following definitions refer to the temporal relation with seizures.
- Post-ictal refers to the state shortly after the event.
- Interictal refers to the period between seizures, or convulsions, that are characteristic of an epilepsy disorder. For most people with epilepsy, the interictal state corresponds to more than 99% of their life. The interictal period is often used by neurologists when diagnosing epilepsy since an EEG trace will often show small interictal spiking and other abnormalities known by neurologists as subclinical seizures. Interictal EEG discharges are those abnormal waveforms not associated with seizure symptoms.

== Signs and symptoms ==
Jerome Engel defines the postictal state as "manifestations of seizure-induced reversible alterations in neuronal function but not structure." Commonly after a seizure, a person feels mentally and physically exhausted for up to one or two days. The most common complaint is an inability to think clearly, specifically "poor attention and concentration, poor short term memory, decreased verbal and interactive skills, and a variety of cognitive defects specific to individuals."

Postictal migraine headaches are a major complaint among persons with epilepsy, and can have a variety of etiologies. One possible cause of these migraines is high intracranial pressure resulting from postictal cerebral edema. At times, a person may be unaware of having had a seizure, and the characteristic migraine is their only clue.

Other symptoms associated with the postictal state are less common. Todd's paresis is a temporary regional loss of function in whatever region just experienced the seizure, and its manifestation depends on where the seizure was located. Loss of motor function is most common and can range from weakness to full paralysis. About 6% of patients who had tonic–clonic seizures experienced Todd's paresis afterward, with loss of motor function sometimes accompanied with temporary numbness, blindness, or deafness. Todd's paresis can also cause anterograde amnesia if the seizure included the bilateral hippocampi, and aphasia if the seizures began in the language-dominant hemisphere. Symptoms typically last about 15 hours, but can continue for 36 hours.

Postictal psychosis is a neuropsychiatric sequel to seizures of chronic epilepsy in adults. Tending to occur with bilateral seizure types, it is characterized by auditory and visual hallucinations, delusions, paranoia, affective change, and aggression. Following the typical postictal confusion and lethargy, the person gradually recovers to a normal lucid state. In persons who experience postictal psychosis, this "lucid phase" usually continues at least 6 hours (and up to a week), followed by the psychosis lasting as little as one hour to more than 3 months (the mean is 9–10 days). The psychosis is typically treated medically using atypical antipsychotics and benzodiazepines, and successful epilepsy surgery can resolve the psychotic episodes.

Postictal bliss or euphoria is also reported following seizures. This has been described as a highly blissful feeling associated with the emergence from amnesia. Feelings of depression before a seizure may lead to postictal euphoria.

Some of postictal symptoms are almost always present for a period of a few hours up to a day or two. Absence seizures do not produce a postictal state and some seizure types may have very brief postictal states. Otherwise, the lack of typical postictal symptoms, such as confusion and lethargy following convulsive seizures, may be a sign of non-epileptic seizures. Usually such seizures are instead related to syncope or have a psychogenic origin ("pseudoseizures").

The postictal state can also be useful for determining the focus of the seizure. Decreased verbal memory (short term) tends to result from a seizure in the dominant hemisphere, whereas seizures in the non-dominant hemisphere tend to manifest with decreased visual memory. Inability to read suggests seizure foci in the language areas of the left hemisphere, and "after a seizure semivoluntary events as mundane as nose wiping tend to be done with the hand ipsilateral to (that is on the same side as) the seizure focus."

== Mechanism ==
While it might seem that the neurons become “exhausted” after the near-constant firing involved in a seizure, the ability of the neuron to carry an action potential following a seizure is not decreased. Neurons of the brain fire normally when stimulated, even after long periods of status epilepticus.

=== Neurotransmitters ===
Neurotransmitters must be present in the axon terminal and then exocytosed into the synaptic cleft in order to propagate the signal to the next neuron. While neurotransmitters are not typically a limiting factor in neuronal signaling rates, it is possible that with extensive firing during seizures neurotransmitters could be used up faster than new ones could be synthesized in the cell and transported down the axon. There is currently no direct evidence for neurotransmitter depletion following seizures.

=== Receptor concentration ===
In studies that stimulate seizures by subjecting rats to electroshock, seizures are followed by unconsciousness and slow waves on an electroencephalogram (EEG), signs of postictal catalepsy. Administering the opiate antagonist naloxone immediately reverses this state, providing evidence that increased responsiveness or concentration of the opiate receptors may be occurring during seizures and may be partially responsible for the weariness humans experience following a seizure. When humans were given naloxone in-between seizures, researchers observed increased activity on their EEGs, suggesting that opioid receptors may also be upregulated during human seizures. To provide direct evidence for this, Hammers et al. did positron emission tomography (PET) scanning of radiolabelled ligands before, during, and after spontaneous seizures in humans. They found that opioid receptors were upregulated in the regions near the focus of the seizure during the ictal phase, gradually returning to baseline availability during the postictal phase. Hammers notes that cerebral bloodflow after a seizure cannot account for the increase in PET activity observed. Regional bloodflow can increase by as much as 70–80% after seizures but normalizes after 30 minutes. The shortest postictal interval in their study was 90 minutes and none of the patients had seizures during the scanning. It has been predicted that a decrease in opioid activity following a seizure could cause withdrawal symptoms, contributing to postictal depression. The opioid receptor connection with mitigating seizures has been disputed, and opioids have been found to have different functions in different regions of the brain, having both proconvulsive and anticonvulsive effects.

=== Active inhibition ===
It is possible that seizures cease spontaneously, but it is much more probable that some changes in the brain create inhibitory signals that serve to tamp down the overactive neurons and effectively end the seizure. Opioid peptides have been shown to be involved in the postictal state and are at times anticonvulsive, and adenosine has also been implicated as a molecule potentially involved in terminating seizures. Evidence for the theory of active inhibition lies in the postictal refractory period, a period of weeks or even months following a series of seizures in which seizures cannot be induced (using animal models and a technique called kindling, in which seizures are induced with repeated electrical stimulation).

Leftover inhibitory signals are the most likely explanation for why there would be a period in which the threshold for provoking a second seizure is high, and lowered excitability may also explain some of the postictal symptoms. Inhibitory signals could be through GABA receptors (both fast and slow IPSPs), calcium-activated potassium receptors (which give rise to afterhyperpolarization), hyperpolarizing pumps, or other changes in ion channels or signal receptors.

While not an example of active inhibition, acidosis of the blood could aid in ending the seizure and also depress neuron firing following its conclusion. As muscles contract during tonic-clonic seizures they outpace oxygen supplies and go into anaerobic metabolism. With continued contractions under anaerobic conditions, the cells undergo lactic acidosis, or the production of lactic acid as a metabolic byproduct. This acidifies the blood (higher H+ concentration, lower pH), which has many impacts on the brain. For one, “hydrogen ions compete with other ions at the ion channel associated with N-methyl-d-aspartate (NMDA). This competition may partially attenuate NMDA receptor and channel mediated hyperexcitability after seizures.”

=== Cerebral bloodflow ===
Cerebral autoregulation typically ensures that the correct amount of blood reaches the various regions of the brain to match the activity of the cells in that region. In other words, perfusion typically matches metabolism in all organs; especially in the brain, which gets the highest priority. However, following a seizure it has been shown that sometimes cerebral blood flow is not proportionate to metabolism. While cerebral blood flow didn't change in the mouse hippocampus (the foci of seizures in this model) during or after seizures, increases in relative glucose uptake were observed in the region during the ictal and early postictal periods. Animal models are difficult for this type of study because each type of seizure model produces a unique pattern of perfusion and metabolism. Thus, in different models of epilepsy, researchers have had differing results as to whether or not metabolism and perfusion become uncoupled. Hosokawa's model used EL mice, in which seizures begin in the hippocampus and present similarly to the behaviors observed in human epileptic patients. If humans show similar uncoupling of perfusion and metabolism, this would result in hypoperfusion in the affected area, a possible explanation for the confusion and 'fog' patients experience following a seizure.

== See also ==
- Ictal headache
