= Awake craniotomy =

Neurosurgery performed while the patient is awake

- Specialty: Neurology

Awake craniotomy is a neurosurgical technique and type of craniotomy that allows a surgeon to remove a brain tumor while the patient is awake to avoid brain damage. During the surgery, the neurosurgeon performs cortical mapping to identify vital areas, called the "eloquent brain", that should not be disturbed while removing the tumor.

== Uses ==
A particular use for awake craniotomy is mapping the cortex to avoid causing language or movement deficits with the surgery. It is more effective than surgeries performed under general anesthesia in avoiding complications. Awake craniotomy can be used in a variety of brain tumors, including glioblastomas, gliomas, and brain metastases. It can also be used for epilepsy surgery to remove a larger amount of the section of tissue causing the seizures without damaging function, for deep brain stimulation placement, or for pallidotomy. Awake craniotomy has increased the scope of tumors that are considered resectable (treatable by surgery) and in general, reduces recovery time. Awake craniotomy is also associated with reduced iatrogenic brain damage after surgery.

== Technique ==
Before an awake craniotomy begins for tumor or epilepsy surgery, the patient is given anxiolytic medications. The patient is then positioned in a neurosurgical head restraint that holds the head completely still and given general anesthesia. The anesthesiologist will then use local anesthetics like lidocaine or bupivacaine to numb the skin and bone of the head and neck. The craniotomy begins with a surgeon removing an area of the skull over the tumor and cutting into the meninges, the membranes that protect the brain. Before removing any brain tissue, the patient is awakened and the neurosurgeon creates a cortical map, using a small electrical stimulation device to observe the changes in the patient's condition when an area is stimulated. If an area is stimulated and the patient moves or loses some ability, like speech, the surgeon knows that the area is vital and cannot be removed or cut through to access a tumor. During the procedure, the surgeon, anesthesiologist, and other surgical personnel speak to the patient and may ask them questions. A speech and language pathologist and/or a neuropsychologist monitor the patient carefully while the patient performs different types of language/other cognitive tasks. The golden standard for intraoperative tasks is object naming, but there are a number of different tasks that can be used during awake surgery.

There are two variations on the technique: asleep-awake-asleep (AAA), and monitored anesthetic care (MAC), also called conscious sedation. In an AAA surgery, the patient is only awake during the cortical mapping; whereas in an MAC surgery the patient is awake the entire time.

The procedure for deep brain stimulation placement is similar, though instead of skull being removed, a burr hole is drilled for the electrodes instead and the MAC surgery is more common.

== Complications ==
The complications of awake craniotomy are similar to complications from brain surgery done under general anesthesia – seizures during the operation, nausea, vomiting, loss of motor or speech function, hemodynamic instability (hypertension, hypotension, or tachycardia), cerebral edema, hemorrhage, stroke or air embolism, and death. Seizures are the most common complication.

Awake surgery in gliomas is known to cause postoperative language and other cognitive impairments, however the frequency and severity is not well established due to e.g. differences in patient selection, test methods and how deficits are defined. In the sub-acute phase (1-10 days postoperatively) the difficulties may be quite severe, but gradual recovery is expected.

== Contraindications ==
There are patients for whom an awake craniotomy is not appropriate. Those with anxiety disorders, claustrophobia, schizophrenia, or low pain tolerance are poor candidates for an awake surgery because any treatment of a psychological crisis would harm the procedure and could harm the patient. Additionally, patients with obstructive sleep apnea are usually considered poor candidates due to problems with oxygenation, ventilation, and a potentially difficult airway.
