= Epilepsy surgery =

Brain surgery to treat epilepsy

- Specialty: Neurology, neurosurgery, epileptology

Epilepsy surgery involves a neurosurgical procedure where an area of the brain involved in seizures is either resected, ablated, disconnected or stimulated. The goal is to eliminate seizures or significantly reduce seizure burden. Approximately 60% of all people with epilepsy (0.4% of the population of industrialized countries) have focal epilepsy syndromes. In 20% to 30% of these patients, the condition is not adequately controlled with adequate trials of two anticonvulsive drugs, termed drug resistant epilepsy, or refractory epilepsy. Such patients are potential candidates for surgical epilepsy treatment.

First line therapy for epilepsy involves treatment with anticonvulsive drugs, also called antiepileptic drugs– most patients will respond to trials of one or two different medications. The goal of treatment is the elimination of seizures, since uncontrolled seizures carry significant risks, including injury and sudden unexpected death in epilepsy. In patients with refractory epilepsy, surgery is considered the only curative option. Epilepsy surgery has been performed for more than a century, but its use dramatically increased in the 1980s and 1990s, reflecting advancement in technique and improved efficacy in selected patients.

== Evaluation ==
The pre-surgical evaluation for epilepsy is designed to locate the "epileptic focus" or the "epileptogenic zone" (the location where the epilepsy originates in the brain) and to determine if/how surgery could affect normal brain function. Defining the epileptogenic zone has a fundamental role in determining the boundaries of the area that needs to be removed in order to relieve seizures but also to avoid harming the "eloquent cortex" or areas of the brain that control functions such as language, motor control, or vision. Resective surgery involves cutting away or disconnecting areas of the brain that are generating or propagating seizures. Epileptologists, neurologists with special training in epilepsy, will also confirm the diagnosis of epilepsy to make sure that seizure-like activity is truly due to epilepsy as opposed to non-epileptic seizures.

The evaluation typically includes neurological physical examination, routine electroencephalography (EEG), Long-term video-EEG monitoring, neuropsychological evaluation, and neuroimaging such as MRI, functional magnetic resonance imaging (fMRI), single photon emission computed tomography (SPECT), positron emission tomography (PET), and magnetoencephalography (MEG). Neuroimaging can help identify if there is a structural cause for the seizures, such as a tumor or abnormal blood vessels such as arteriovenous malformations (AVMs). Several imaging techniques including MRI, SPECT, and PET have been found to identify the epileptogenic zone in anywhere from 50% to 80% of cases. Some epilepsy centers use intracarotid sodium amobarbital test (Wada test) and fMRI when evaluating temporal lobe epilepsy surgery, as surgeries in this area of the brain can affect memory. Recent studies note fMRI outperforming the Wada test for memory and language localization. Current research into pre-surgical evaluation includes computer models of seizure generation, high-frequency oscillations as biomarkers of epilepsy, and magnetoencephalography for repeat epilepsy surgeries.

If noninvasive testing was inadequate in identifying the epileptic focus or in distinguishing the surgical target from normal brain tissue and function, then long-term video-EEG monitoring with the use of intracranial electrodes may be required for evaluation. Brain mapping by the technique of cortical electrical stimulation or electrocorticography are other procedures used in the process of invasive testing for certain patients.

Once the epilepsy focus is located, the specific surgery involved in treatment is decided on. The type of surgery depends on the location of the seizure focal point. Surgeries for epilepsy treatment include, but are not limited to: temporal lobe resection, hemispherectomy, ground temporal and extratemporal resection, parietal resection, occipital resection, frontal resection, extratemporal resection, and callosotomy.

== Hemispherectomy ==
Hemispherectomy or hemispherotomy involves removal or a functional disconnection of most, or all of, one half of the brain typically leaving the basal ganglia and thalamus. It is reserved for people with the most catastrophic epilepsies, such as those due to Rasmussen's encephalitis. If the surgery is performed on very young patients (2–5 years old), then the remaining hemisphere may acquire some motor control of the ipsilateral body due to neuroplasticity; in older patients, paralysis results on the side of the body opposite to the part of the brain that was removed with less prospect for recovery. A visual field defect is an unavoidable side effect, typically involving a homonymous hemianopia involving loss of the half of the visual field on the same side of the disconnected brain. Because of these and other side-effects, it is usually reserved for patients having exhausted other treatment options, including for children under 3 years of age who have drug-resistant epilepsy.

Hemispherectomies can be divided into three main types: anatomic, functional, and hemidecortication. Anatomic hemispherectomy involves the surgical removal of an entire cerebral hemisphere excluding deep structures such as the basal ganglia, thalamus, and brainstem to preserve vital functions. WE Dandy recorded the first anatomic hemispherectomy in 1928 for glioma resection and the first surgery for epilepsy was performed by McKenzie ten years later. This approach is less commonly performed due to high risks of complications, such as hydrocephalus due to blockage of the foramen of Monro, one of the passages that drains cerebrospinal fluid in the brain and spine, and superficial cerebral hemosiderosis (SCH). The procedure became less popular with the introduction of new antiepileptic drugs in the 1960s.

Functional hemispherectomies differ in that they disconnect the affected hemisphere from the rest of the brain to prevent spread from the epileptogenic focus to other parts of the brain. Structures involved can include the corpus callosum and thalamocortical fibers, as they are implicated in relaying information between the brain's hemispheres. Many approaches are available and overall are described according to their surgical plane including vertical (between the two hemispheres) and lateral (along the Sylvian fissure). Depending on each patient case, alternate procedures such as hemidecortication or peri-insular hemispherectomies are available to disrupt the epilepsy signal but remain less invasive to minimize risks.

== Temporal lobe resection ==
Temporal lobe resection acts as a treatment option for patients with temporal lobe epilepsy, or those whose seizure focus is in the temporal lobe. Temporal lobe seizures are the most common type (approximately 30% of diagnoses) of seizures for teens and young adults. The procedure involves resecting, or cutting away, brain tissue within the region of the temporal lobe in order to remove the seizure focus. Specific evaluation for temporal lobe resection requires convergent clinical, MRI, and EEG data in order to precisely pinpoint the focal area and boundaries of the focal area.

The surgery has produced successful outcomes, controlling seizures in as much as 70 percent of temporal lobe epilepsy patients. Follow-up studies suggest that the procedure also has produced positive long-term effects that illustrate 63 percent of patients still remaining seizure-free. Although the procedure produces positive outcomes for patients regarding seizure control, it can also produce negative outcomes such as memory impairment, visual disturbance, and cognitive dysfunction. Hemispheric dominance can determine the likelihood of certain complications of surgery in the temporal lobe; for the majority of right-handed people, the left hemisphere is dominant and is associated with the brain's language centers (most notably Wernicke's area) and the right (non-dominant) hemisphere is associated with memory and learning of non verbal information such as vision. Thus, temporal lobe resection of the dominant hemisphere often causes verbal memory impairment while resection of the non-dominant hemisphere often causes visual memory impairment.

Important structures implicated in temporal lobectomies include the auditory cortex, hippocampus, Wernicke's area, and amygdala; the latter three broadly affecting memory, language, and emotion, respectively. The hippocampus, amygdala, and parahippocampal gyrus are collectively termed the mesial temporal structures and are frequently targeted for resection in epilepsy.

Types of temporal lobectomy include anterior temporal lobectomy (ATL) and selective amygdalohippocampectomy (SAH). The ATL resection is the most common technique where the lateral and polar cortex are removed along with the aforementioned mesial temporal structures as well as the posterior part depending on which hemisphere the epileptogenic zone lies. The most common complication after ATL is a defect in vision known as a homonymous superior quadrantanopia, wherein the upper quarter field of vision on both eyes is altered, known as the "pie in the sky defect", with a frequency from 1.5% to 22%. ATL surgery resection encompasses the amygdala, hippocampus as well as surrounding tissue or neocortex whereas SAH is more targeted to the former two structures to be as minimally disruptive as possible. The SAH approach goes through a space on the lateral side of the brain known as the Sylvian fissure to reach the amygdala and hippocampus which are deeper in the middle of the brain. These structures may also be targeted through the middle temporal gyrus, below the Sylvian fissure, to avoid the visual pathways that course near the top of the temporal lobe.

The decision between ATL and SAH should include a multidisciplinary team involving an epileptologist and neurosurgeon and tailored to each patient's specific case. Both have varying rates of seizure freedom depending on how well the epileptogenic zone is localized. One meta-analysis found that there is no significant difference in seizure freedom but visual complications after surgery were less frequent in SAH.

== Extratemporal resection ==
Extratemporal lobe resection acts as a treatment option for patients with extratemporal epilepsy, or epilepsy patients whose seizure focus is outside of the temporal lobe, and stems from either the occipital lobes, parietal lobe, frontal lobe, or in multiple lobes. The evaluation for the procedure often requires more than clinical, MRI, and EEG convergence due to the variability of the seizure focus. Along with additional imaging techniques such as PET and SPECT, invasive studies may be needed to pinpoint the seizure focus. The efficacy of extratemporal lobe resection generally is less than resection of the temporal lobe. For example, in frontal lobe resections seizure freedom has been achieved in 38-44 percent of patients.

== Tumor Resection ==
If a benign or malignant brain tumor is suspected to be the cause of seizure activity, surgical removal of the tumor may be indicated. The approach and technique is case-dependent. One study of supratentorial brain tumors in children less observed a dramatic reduction in the severity and frequency of seizures at one and four year follow-up.

See also Brain tumors.

== Laser Interstitial Thermal Therapy (LITT) ==
LITT is a minimally invasive technique under imaging guidance (typically MRI) where a small hole is drilled through the skull (a Burr hole) and a precise laser targets structures that are causing seizures, known as laser ablation. Ablative procedures are appropriate options for patients who otherwise would not be good surgical candidates due to other medical problems or specific anatomical reasons that would make targeting their epilepsy difficult with a traditional surgery. Outcomes for each type of surgery vary widely depending on seizure localization, epilepsy specifics, and surgeon approach. Given that this is a new technique, more research into comparing outcomes is necessary but preliminary studies suggest lower seizure freedom.

See also ablative brain surgery.

== See also ==
- Engel classification
- Anticonvulsant
- Temporal lobe
- Temporal lobe epilepsy
- Epilepsy syndromes
- Rasmussen Encephalitis
- Sturge–Weber syndrome
- Hippocampal sclerosis
