= Chronic electrode implant =

Device for long-term recording or stimulation of neural activity in living tissue

A chronic electrode implant is an electronic device implanted chronically (for a long period) into the brain or other electrically excitable tissue. It may record electrical impulses in the brain or may stimulate neurons with electrical impulses from an external source.

== Clinical applications and direction ==
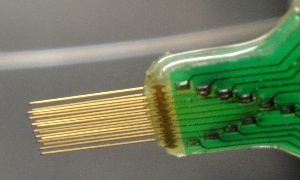
Example of chronic electrode implant

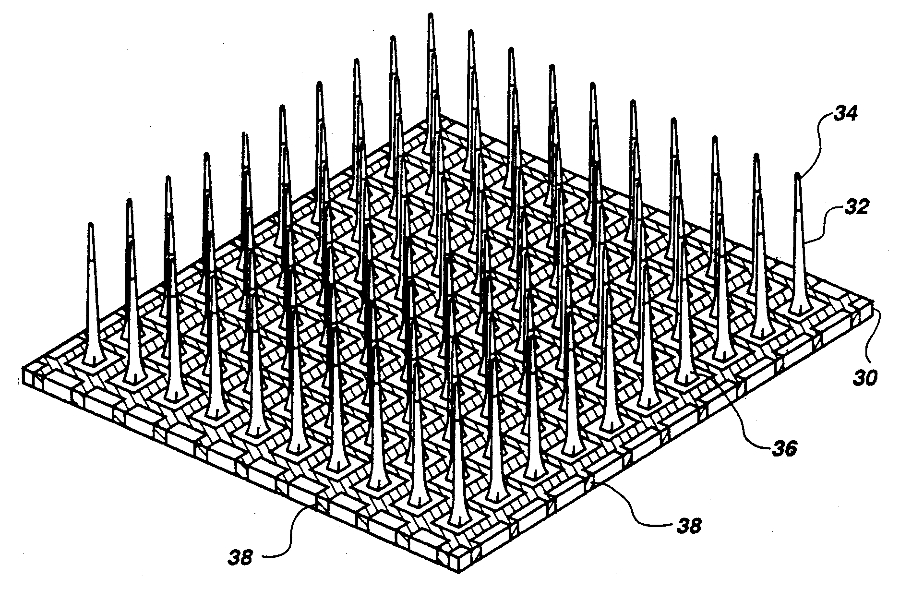
Schematic of the "Utah" chronic electrode array

=== Clinical applications for brain computer interfaces (BCI) ===
The potential for neural interfacing technology to restore lost sensory or motor function is staggering; victims of paralysis due to peripheral nerve injury could achieve a full recovery by directly recording the output of their motor cortex, but the technology is immature and unreliable. There are numerous examples in the literature of intra-cortical electrode recording used to a variety of ends that fail after a few weeks, a few months at best. This document will review the current state of research into electrode failure, focusing on recording electrodes as opposed to stimulating electrodes.

=== Direction for development of Chronic BCI ===
Chronic brain-computer interfaces come in two varieties, stimulating and recording. Applications for stimulating interfaces include sensory prosthetics (cochlear implants), for example, are the most successful variety of sensory prosthetics) and deep brain stimulation therapies, while recording interfaces can be used for research applications and to record the activity of speech or motor centers directly from the brain. In principle these systems are susceptible to the same tissue response that causes failure in implanted electrodes, but stimulating interfaces can overcome this problem by increasing signal strength. Recording electrodes, however, must rely on whatever signals are present where they are implanted, and cannot easily be made more sensitive.

Current implantable microelectrodes are unable to record single- or multi-unit activity reliably on a chronic scale. Lebedev and Nicolelis discuss in their 2006 review the specific needs for research in the field to truly improve the technology to the level of clinical implementation. They suggest four directions for improvement:

- Consistent long term (over the course of years) recording of large neuronal populations residing in multiple brain areas
- Efficient computational processing of recorded data
- Incorporation of feedback into the user's body image using native plasticity
- Advances in prosthetic technology to create artificial limbs capable of reproducing the full range of motion

This review will focus on techniques pursued in the literature that are relevant to achieving the goal of consistent, long-term recordings. Research towards this end can be divided into two primary categories: characterizing the specific causes of recording failure, and techniques for preventing or delaying electrode failure.

== Interaction between electrode and tissue ==
As mentioned above, if there is to be significant progress towards long-term implantable electrodes, an important step is documenting the response of living tissue to electrode implantation in both the acute and chronic timelines. It is ultimately this tissue response that causes electrodes to fail by encapsulating the electrode itself in a protective layer called a "glial scar", (see 2.2). One serious impediment to understanding the tissue response is the lack of true standardization of implantation technique or of electrode materials. Common materials for electrode or probe construction include silicon, platinum, iridium, polyimide, ceramic, gold, as well as others. In addition to the variety of materials used, electrodes are constructed in many different shapes, including planar shanks, simple uniform microwires, and probes that taper to a thin tip from a wider base. Implantable electrode research also employs many different techniques for surgically implanting the electrodes; the most critical differences are whether or not the implant is anchored across the skull and the speed of insertion. The overall observed tissue response is caused by a combination of the traumatic injury of electrode insertion and the persistent presence of a foreign body in the neural tissue.

=== Defining and minimizing acute term effects of electrode insertion ===
Damage caused by electrodes in the short term is caused by the insertion into the tissue. Consequently, research into minimizing this is focused on the geometry of the electrode and the proper technique for insertion. Short term effects of electrode insertion on surrounding tissue have been documented extensively. They include cell death (both neuronal and glial), severed neuronal processes and blood vessels, mechanical tissue compression, and collection of debris resulting from cell death.

In the Bjornsson et al. 2006 study, an ex vivo apparatus was constructed explicitly to study the deformation of and damage to neural tissue during electrode insertion. Electrodes were constructed from silicon wafers to have three different sharpnesses (interior angle of 5° for sharp, 90° for medium, 150° for blunt). Insertion speed was also presented at three speeds, 2 mm/s, 0.5 mm/s, and 0.125 mm/s. Qualitative assessments of vascular damage were made by taking real-time images of electrodes being inserted into 500 um thick coronal brain slices. To facilitate direct visualization of vascular deformation, tissue was labeled with fluorescent dextran and microbeads before viewing. The fluorescent dextran filled the blood vessels, allowing initial geometry to be visualized along with any distortions or breakages. Fluorescent microbeads lodged throughout the tissue, providing discrete coordinates that aided in computerized calculations of strain and deformation. Analysis of the images prompted the division of tissue damage into 4 categories:

- 1) fluid displacement,
- 2) vessel rupture,
- 3) vessel severing, and
- 4) vessel dragging.

Fluid displacement by device insertion frequently resulted in ruptured vessels. Severing and dragging were consistently present along the insertion track, but did not correlate with tip geometry. Rather, these features were correlated with insertion speed, being more prevalent at medium and slow insertion speeds. Faster insertion of sharp probes was the only condition resulting in no reported vascular damage.

=== Tissue response to chronic-term electrode implantation ===
When implanted in neural tissue in the long term, microelectrodes stimulate a sort of foreign body response, primarily effected by astrocytes and microglia. Each cell-type performs many functions in supporting healthy, uninjured neural tissue, and each is also 'activated' by injury related mechanisms that result in changes in morphology, expression profile, and function. Tissue response has also been shown to be greater in situation where the electrodes are anchored through the subject's skull; the tethering forces aggravate the injury caused by the electrode's insertion and sustain the tissue response.

One function taken on by microglia when activated is to cluster around foreign bodies and degrade them enzymatically. It has been proposed that when the foreign body cannot be degraded, as in the case of implanted electrodes whose material composition is resistant to such enzymatic dissolution, this 'frustrated phagocytosis' contributes to the failure of recordings, releasing necrotic substances into the immediate vicinity and contributing to cell death around the electrode.

Activated astrocytes form the major component of the encapsulating tissue that forms around implanted electrodes. "Current theories hold that glial encapsulation, i.e. gliosis, insulates the electrode from nearby neurons, thereby hindering diffusion and increasing impedance, extends the distance between the electrode and its nearest target neurons, or creates an inhibitory environment for neurite extension, thus repelling regenerating neural processes away from recording sites". Either activated astrocytes or buildup of cellular debris from cell death around the electrode would act to insulate the recording sites from other, active neurons. Even very small increases in the separation between the electrode and local nerve population can insulate the electrode completely, as electrodes must be within 100 μm to get a signal.

Another recent study addressed the problem of the tissue response. Michigan-type electrodes (see article for detailed dimensions) were surgically inserted into the brains of Adult male Fischer 344 rats; a control population was treated with the same surgical procedures, but the electrode was implanted and immediately removed so that a comparison could be made between tissue response to acute injury and chronic presence. Animal subjects were sacrificed at 2 and 4 weeks after implantation to quantify the tissue response with histological and immunostaining techniques. Samples were stained for ED1 and GFAP presence. ED1+ reading is indicative of the presence of macrophages, and was observed in a densely packed region within approximately 50 μm of the electrode surface. ED1+ cells were present at both 2 and 4 weeks after implantation, with no significant difference between the time points. Presence of GFAP indicates presence of reactive astrocytes, and was seen at 2 and 4 weeks after implantation, extending more than 500 μm from the electrode surface. Stab controls showed signs of inflammation and reactive gliosis as well, however signals were significantly lower in intensity than those found in chronic test subjects, and diminished noticeably from 2 weeks to 4 weeks. This is strong evidence that glial scarring and the encapsulation, and eventual isolation, of implanted microelectrodes is primarily a result of chronic implantation, and not the acute injury.

Another recent study addressing the impact of chronically implanted electrodes points that tungsten-coated electrodes seem to be well tolerated by the nervous tissue, inducing a small and circumscribed inflammatory response only in the vicinity of the implant, associated with a small cell death.

== Developing methods to alleviate chronic effects ==
Techniques for combating long-term failure of electrodes are typically focused on disarming the foreign body response. This can most obviously be achieved by improving the biocompatibility of the electrode itself, thus reducing the tissue's perception of the electrode as a foreign substance. As a result, much of the research towards alleviating the tissue response is focused on improving biocompatibility.

It is difficult to effectively evaluate progress towards improved electrode biocompatibility because of the variety of research in this field.

=== Improving biocompatibility of recording electrodes ===
This section loosely categorizes different approaches to improving biocompatibility seen in the literature. Descriptions of the research are limited to a brief summary of the theory and technique, not the results, which are presented in detail in the original publications. Thus far, no technique has achieved results drastic and sweeping enough to change the fact of the encapsulation response.

==== Biological coating ====
Research focusing on bioactive coatings to alleviate the tissue response is conducted primarily on silicon-based electrodes. Techniques include the following:

- storing anti-inflammatory neuropeptide α-MSH under a layer of nitrocellulose or within a nitrocellulose matrix to be released gradually into the local tissue post-implantation;
- coating electrodes with alternating layers of polyethylimine (PEI) and laminin (LN), with the objective of the outer LN layer decreasing the tissue response by helping to disguise the electrode as native material;
- coating electrodes with a conductive polymer film to improve electrical characteristics, overcoming the encapsulation barrier by increasing electrode sensitivity.

==== Protein functionalization ====
Another body of research dedicated to improving the biocompatibility of electrodes focuses on functionalizing the electrode surface with relevant protein sequences. Studies have demonstrated that surfaces functionalized with sequences taken from adhesive peptides will decrease cellular motility and support higher neuronal populations. It has also been shown that peptides can be selected to specifically support neuronal growth or glial growth, and that peptides can be deposited in patterns to guide cellular outgrowth. If populations of neurons can be induced to grow onto inserted electrodes, electrode failure should be minimized.

==== Electrode design ====
Kennedy's research details the use of a glass cone electrode which contains a microwire built inside of it. The microwire is used for recording, and the cone is filled with neurotrophic substances or neural tissue in order to promote growth of local neurons into the electrode to allow for recording. This approach overcomes tissue response by encouraging neurons to grow closer to recording surface.

=== Microfluid delivery ===
Some notable success has also been made in developing microfluid delivery mechanisms that could ostensibly deliver targeted pharmacological agents to electrode implantation sites to alleviate the tissue response.

== Research tools being developed ==
Just as in other fields, some effort is devoted explicitly to the development of standardized research tools. The goal of these tools is to provide a powerful, objective way of analyzing the failure of chronic neural electrodes in order to improve the reliability of the technology.

One such effort describes the development of an in vitro model to study the tissue response phenomenon. Midbrains are surgically removed from day 14 Fischer 344 rats and grown in culture to create a confluent layer of neurons, microglia, and astrocytes. This confluent layer can be used to study the foreign body response by scrape-injury or depositing electrode microwires on the monolayer, fixing the culture at defined time points after insertion/injury and studying tissue response with histological methods.

Another research tool is a numerical model of the mechanical electrode-tissue interface. The goal of this model is not to detail the electrical or chemical characteristics of the interface, but the mechanical ones created by electrode-tissue adhesion, tethering forces, and strain mismatch. This model can be used to predict forces generated at the interface by electrodes of different material stiffnesses or geometries.

For studies requiring a massive quantity of identical electrodes, a bench-top technique has been demonstrated in the literature to use a silicon shape as a master to produce multiple copies out of polymeric materials via a PDMS intermediate. This is exceptionally useful for material studies or for labs who need a high volume of electrodes but cannot afford to buy them all.

== See also ==
- Auditory brainstem implant
- Brain implant
