= Inter-ictal spiking =

Clinical sign in epilepsy

Inter-ictal spiking refers to abnormal neuronal discharges between epileptic seizures. This abnormal activity can originate from one or more cranial lobes, often travelling from one lobe to another, and interfere with normal activity in the affected lobe. Patients with severe, intractable forms of epilepsy can experience unremitting abnormal brain activity due to inter-ictal spiking.

This phenomenon has been confirmed through telemetry by electrocorticography in which electrode grids are positioned subdurally and augmented by intracranial depth electrodes. The EEG tracings from these are correlated with external video recordings of physical responses to epileptic seizures to help determine the type of seizure and origin of onset.
