= Local field potential =

Transient electrical signals

Local field potentials (LFP) are transient electrical signals generated in nerves and other tissues by the summed and synchronous electrical activity of the individual cells (e.g. neurons) in that tissue. LFP are "extracellular" signals, meaning that they are generated by transient imbalances in ion concentrations in the spaces outside the cells, that result from cellular electrical activity. LFP are 'local' because they are recorded by an electrode placed nearby the generating cells. As a result of the Inverse-square law, such electrodes can only 'see' potentials in a spatially limited radius. They are potentials generated by the voltage that results from charge separation in the extracellular space, which produce a local electric field. LFP are typically recorded with a high-impedance microelectrode placed in the midst of the population of cells generating it. They can be recorded, for example, via a microelectrode placed in the brain of a human or animal subject, or in an in vitro brain thin slice.

== Background ==
During local field potential recordings, a signal is recorded using an extracellular microelectrode placed sufficiently far from individual local neurons to prevent any particular cell from dominating the electrophysiological signal. This signal is then low-pass filtered, cut off at ~300 Hz, to obtain the local field potential (LFP) that can be recorded electronically or displayed on an oscilloscope for analysis. The low impedance and positioning of the electrode allows the activity of a large number of neurons to contribute to the signal. The unfiltered signal reflects the sum of action potentials from cells within approximately 50-350 μm from the tip of the electrode and slower ionic events from within 0.5–3 mm from the tip of the electrode. The low-pass filter removes the spike component of the signal and passes the lower frequency signal, the LFP.

The voltmeter or analog-to-digital converter to which the microelectrode is connected measures the electrical potential difference (measured in volts) between the microelectrode and a reference electrode. One end of the reference electrode is also connected to the voltmeter while the other end is placed in a medium which is continuous with, and compositionally identical to the extracellular medium. In a simple fluid, with no biological component present, there would be slight fluctuations in the measured potential difference around an equilibrium point, this is known as the thermal noise. This is due to the random movement of ions in the medium and electrons in the electrode. However, when placed in neural tissue the opening of an ion channel results in the net flow of ions into the cell from the extracellular medium, or out of the cell into the extracellular medium. These local currents result in larger changes in the electrical potential between the local extracellular medium and the interior of the recording electrode. The overall recorded signal thus represents the potential caused by the sum of all local currents on the surface of the electrode.

== Synchronised input ==
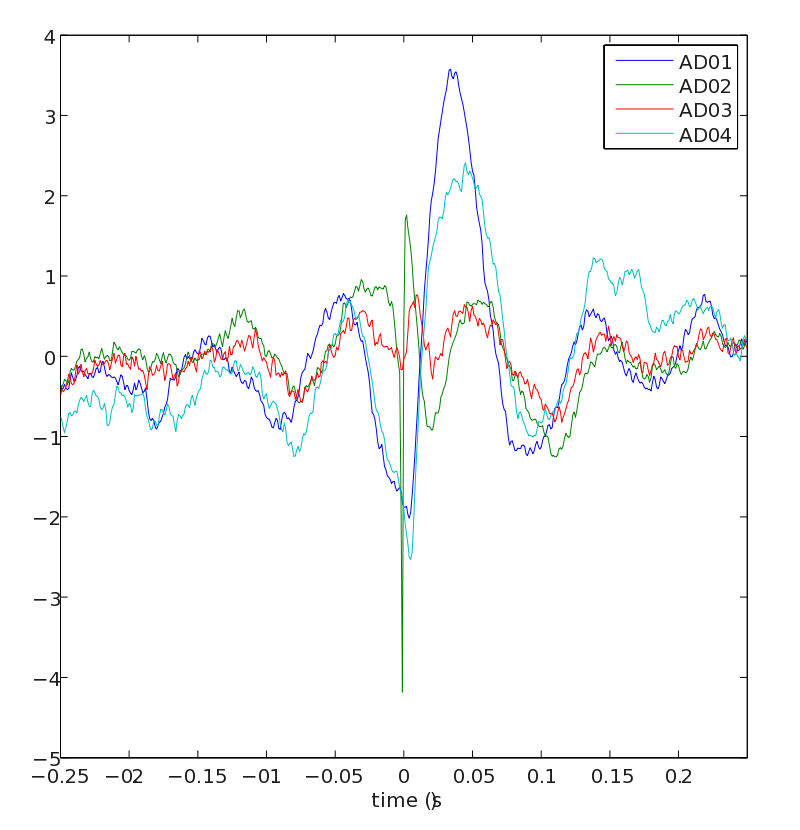
Spike-triggered averages of LFP from 4 recording sites. The spike is the sharp downward deflection at t = 0. The spike is preceded by slow oscillations (alpha), the spike happens at the trough of the LFP.

The local field potential is believed to represent the sum of synaptic inputs into the observed area, as opposed to the spikes, which represents the output from the area. The fast fluctuations are mostly caused by the short inward and outward currents of action potentials, while the LFP is composed of the more sustained currents in the tissue that are generated by synaptic activity (EPSCs and IPSCs). Data-driven models have shown a predictive relationship between the LFPs and spike activity. A common method to investigate LFP oscillations that lead to spikes is to calculate spike-triggered averages (see figure). This is done after the recording (off line) by detecting the spikes as fast downward deflections, cutting out the temporal sections around the spike (+/- 250 ms) and averaging the spike-aligned traces for each recording site. Alternatively, spikes can be removed from the extracellular recording traces by low-pass filtering, revealing the LFP.

== Geometrical arrangement ==
Which cells contribute to the slow field variations is determined by the geometric configuration of the cells themselves. In some cells, the dendrites face one direction and the soma another, such as the pyramidal cells. This is known as an open field geometrical arrangement. When there is simultaneous activation of the dendrites a strong dipole is produced. In cells where the dendrites are arranged more radially, the potential difference between individual dendrites and the soma tend to cancel out with diametrically opposite dendrites, this configuration is called a closed field geometrical arrangement. As a result the net potential difference over the whole cell when the dendrites are simultaneously activated tends to be very small. Thus changes in the local field potential represent simultaneous dendritic events in cells in the open field configuration.

== Simple interpretation of LFP ==
Interpreting LFP through the characteristics of neuronal activity remains a challenge. At the very least, it is clear that electrically compact neurons do not contribute to LFP. Consequently, the minimal model for calculating LFP is a two-compartment model. According to this model, the LFP is determined by the current flowing between the dendritic and somatic compartments. The synaptic component of this current is approximately proportional to the difference between the dendritic and somatic membrane potentials and is combined with the spiking component.

== Low-pass filtering of extracellular space ==
Part of the low-pass filtering giving rise to local field potentials is due to complex electrical properties of extracellular space. The fact that the extracellular space is not homogeneous, and is composed of a complex aggregate of highly conductive fluids and low-conductive and capacitive membranes, can exert strong low-pass filtering properties. Ionic diffusion, which plays an important role in membrane potential variations, can also act as a low-pass filter.
