= Eloquent cortex =

Parts of the cerebral cortex that cause disability if lost

Eloquent cortex is a name used by neurologists for areas of cortex that—if removed—will result in loss of sensory processing or linguistic ability, or paralysis. The most common areas of eloquent cortex are in the left temporal and frontal lobes for speech and language, bilateral occipital lobes for vision, bilateral parietal lobes for sensation, and bilateral motor cortex for movement.

Neuroimaging techniques such as magnetic resonance imaging, electroencephalography, or magnetoencephalography are especially useful non-invasive tools to locate eloquent cortices. Much higher spatial and temporal resolution maps of cortical activity can be achieved with a technique called electrocorticography, however this requires placement of subdural electrodes on the surface of the brain and this must be done during surgery.
