= Microelectrode =

Electrode used in electrophysiology

A microelectrode is an electrode used in electrophysiology either for recording neural signals or for the electrical stimulation of nervous tissue. They were first developed by Ida Hyde in 1921. Pulled glass pipettes with tip diameters of 0.5 μm or less are usually filled with 3 molars potassium chloride solution as the electrical conductor. When the tip penetrates a cell membrane the lipids in the membrane seal onto the glass, providing an excellent electrical connection between the tip and the interior of the cell, which is apparent because the microelectrode becomes electrically negative compared to the extracellular solution. There are also microelectrodes made with insulated metal wires, made from inert metals with high Young modulus such as tungsten, stainless steel, or platinum-iridium alloy and coated with glass or polymer insulator with exposed conductive tips. These are mostly used for recording from the external side of the cell membrane.

== See also ==
- Single-unit recording
- Microelectrode array
