= Electrocorticography =

Type of electrophysiological monitoring

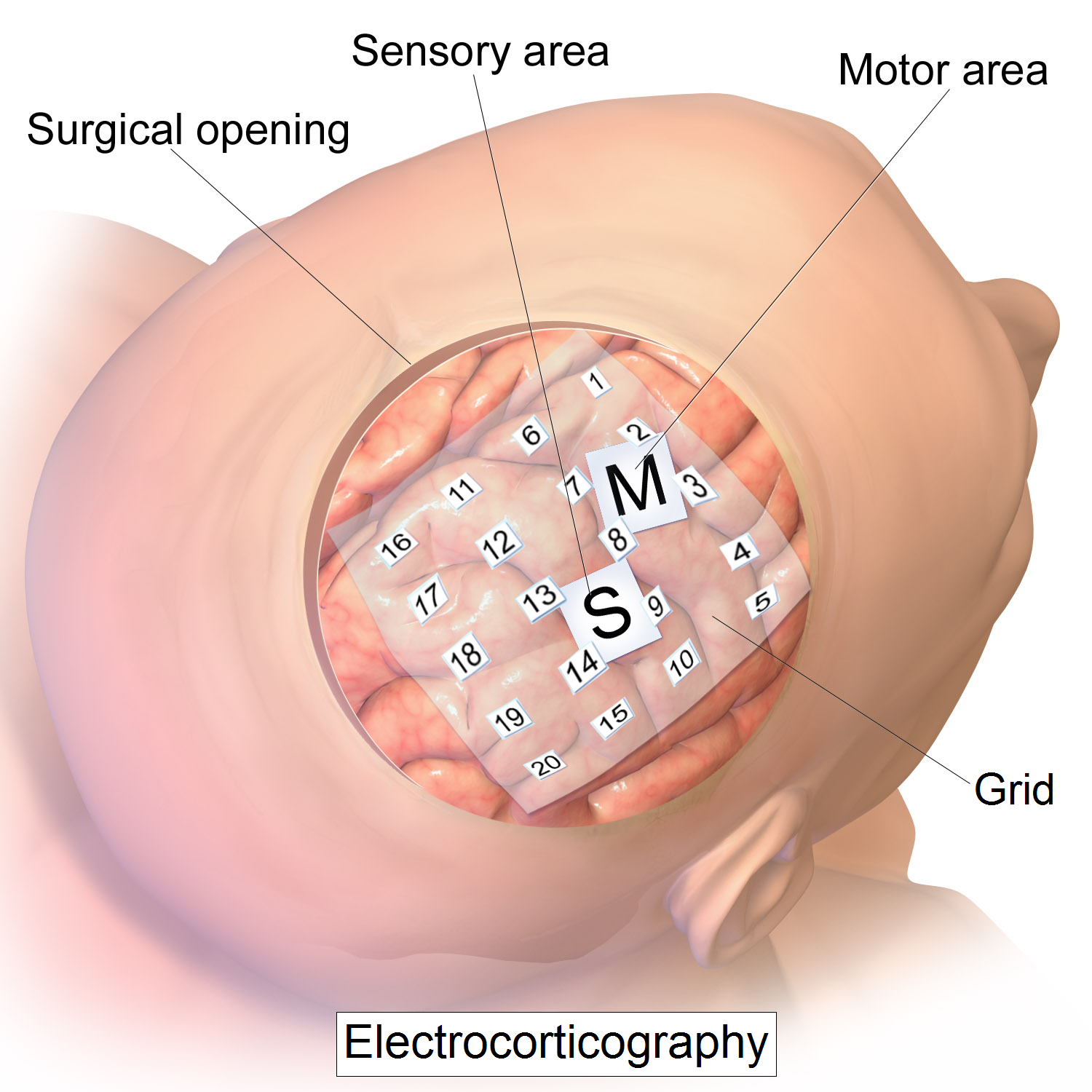
- Intracranial electrode grid for electrocorticography.
- Synonyms: Intracranial electroencephalography
- Purpose: record electrical activity from the cerebral cortex.(invasive)

Electrocorticography (ECoG), a type of intracranial electroencephalography (iEEG), is a type of electrophysiological monitoring that uses electrodes placed directly on the exposed surface of the brain to record electrical activity from the cerebral cortex. In contrast, conventional electroencephalography (EEG) electrodes monitor this activity from outside the skull. ECoG may be performed either in the operating room during surgery (intraoperative ECoG) or outside of surgery (extraoperative ECoG). Because a craniotomy (a surgical incision into the skull) is required to implant the electrode grid, ECoG is an invasive procedure.

== History ==
ECoG was pioneered in the early 1950s by Wilder Penfield and Herbert Jasper, neurosurgeons at the Montreal Neurological Institute. The two developed ECoG as part of their groundbreaking Montreal procedure, a surgical protocol used to treat patients with severe epilepsy. The cortical potentials recorded by ECoG were used to identify epileptogenic zones – regions of the cortex that generate epileptic seizures. These zones would then be surgically removed from the cortex during resectioning, thus destroying the brain tissue where epileptic seizures had originated. Penfield and Jasper also used electrical stimulation during ECoG recordings in patients undergoing epilepsy surgery under local anesthesia. This procedure was used to explore the functional anatomy of the brain, mapping speech areas and identifying the somatosensory and somatomotor cortex areas to be excluded from surgical removal. A doctor named Robert Galbraith Heath was also an early researcher of the brain at the Tulane University School of Medicine.

== Electrophysiological basis ==
ECoG signals are composed of synchronized postsynaptic potentials (local field potentials), recorded directly from the exposed surface of the cortex. The potentials occur primarily in cortical pyramidal cells, and thus must be conducted through several layers of the cerebral cortex, cerebrospinal fluid (CSF), pia mater, and arachnoid mater before reaching subdural recording electrodes placed just below the dura mater (outer cranial membrane). However, to reach the scalp electrodes of a conventional electroencephalogram (EEG), electrical signals must also be conducted through the skull, where potentials rapidly attenuate due to the low conductivity of bone. For this reason, the spatial resolution of ECoG is much higher than EEG, a critical imaging advantage for presurgical planning. ECoG offers a temporal resolution of approximately 5 ms and spatial resolution as low as 1-100 μm.

Using depth electrodes, the local field potential gives a measure of a neural population in a sphere with a radius of 0.5–3 mm around the tip of the electrode. With a sufficiently high sampling rate (more than about 10 kHz), depth electrodes can also measure action potentials. In which case the spatial resolution is down to individual neurons, and the field of view of an individual electrode is approximately 0.05–0.35 mm.

== Procedure ==
The ECoG recording is performed from electrodes placed on the exposed cortex. In order to access the cortex, a surgeon must first perform a craniotomy, removing a part of the skull to expose the brain surface. This procedure may be performed either under general anesthesia or under local anesthesia if patient interaction is required for functional cortical mapping. Electrodes are then surgically implanted on the surface of the cortex, with placement guided by the results of preoperative EEG and magnetic resonance imaging (MRI). Electrodes may either be placed outside the dura mater (epidural) or under the dura mater (subdural). ECoG electrode arrays typically consist of sixteen sterile, disposable stainless steel, carbon tip, platinum, Platinum-iridium alloy or gold ball electrodes, each mounted on a ball and socket joint for ease in positioning. These electrodes are attached to an overlying frame in a "crown" or "halo" configuration. Subdural strip and grid electrodes are also widely used in various dimensions, having anywhere from 4 to 256 electrode contacts. The grids are transparent, flexible, and numbered at each electrode contact. Standard spacing between grid electrodes is 1 cm; individual electrodes are typically 5 mm in diameter. The electrodes sit lightly on the cortical surface, and are designed with enough flexibility to ensure that normal movements of the brain do not cause injury. A key advantage of strip and grid electrode arrays is that they may be slid underneath the dura mater into cortical regions not exposed by the craniotomy. Strip electrodes and crown arrays may be used in any combination desired. Depth electrodes may also be used to record activity from deeper structures such as the hippocampus.

== DCES ==
Direct cortical electrical stimulation (DCES), also known as cortical stimulation mapping, is frequently performed in concurrence with ECoG recording for functional mapping of the cortex and identification of critical cortical structures. When using a crown configuration, a handheld wand bipolar stimulator may be used at any location along the electrode array. However, when using a subdural strip, stimulation must be applied between pairs of adjacent electrodes due to the nonconductive material connecting the electrodes on the grid. Electrical stimulating currents applied to the cortex are relatively low, between 2 and 4 mA for somatosensory stimulation, and near 15 mA for cognitive stimulation. The stimulation frequency is usually 60 Hz in North America and 50 Hz in Europe, and any charge density more than 150 μC/cm2 causes tissue damage.

The functions most commonly mapped through DCES are primary motor, primary sensory, and language. The patient must be alert and interactive for mapping procedures, though patient involvement varies with each mapping procedure. Language mapping may involve naming, reading aloud, repetition, and oral comprehension; somatosensory mapping requires that the patient describe sensations experienced across the face and extremities as the surgeon stimulates different cortical regions.

== Clinical applications ==
Since its development in the 1950s, ECoG has been used to localize epileptogenic zones during presurgical planning, map out cortical functions, and to predict the success of epileptic surgical resectioning. ECoG offers several advantages over alternative diagnostic modalities:

- Flexible placement of recording and stimulating electrodes
- Can be performed at any stage before, during, and after a surgery
- Allows for direct electrical stimulation of the brain, identifying critical regions of the cortex to be avoided during surgery
- Greater precision and sensitivity than an EEG scalp recording – spatial resolution is higher and signal-to-noise ratio is superior due to closer proximity to neural activity

Limitations of ECoG include:

- Limited sampling time – seizures (ictal events) may not be recorded during the ECoG recording period
- Limited field of view – electrode placement is limited by the area of exposed cortex and surgery time, sampling errors may occur
- Recording is subject to the influence of anesthetics, narcotic analgesics, and the surgery itself

=== Intractable epilepsy ===
Epilepsy is currently ranked as the third most commonly diagnosed neurological disorder, afflicting approximately 2.5 million people in the United States alone. Epileptic seizures are chronic and unrelated to any immediately treatable causes, such as toxins or infectious diseases, and may vary widely based on etiology, clinical symptoms, and site of origin within the brain. For patients with intractable epilepsy – epilepsy that is unresponsive to anticonvulsants – surgical treatment may be a viable treatment option. Partial epilepsy is the common intractable epilepsy and the partial seizure is difficult to locate. Treatment for such epilepsy is limited to attachment of vagus nerve stimulator. Epilepsy surgery is the cure for partial epilepsy provided that the brain region generating seizure is carefully and accurately removed.

Extraoperative ECoG

Before a patient can be identified as a candidate for resectioning surgery, MRI must be performed to demonstrate the presence of a structural lesion within the cortex, supported by EEG evidence of epileptogenic tissue. Once a lesion has been identified, ECoG may be performed to determine the location and extent of the lesion and surrounding irritative region. The scalp EEG, while a valuable diagnostic tool, lacks the precision necessary to localize the epileptogenic region. ECoG is considered to be the gold standard for assessing neuronal activity in patients with epilepsy, and is widely used for presurgical planning to guide surgical resection of the lesion and epileptogenic zone. The success of the surgery depends on accurate localization and removal of the epileptogenic zone. ECoG data is assessed with regard to ictal spike activity – "diffuse fast wave activity" recorded during a seizure – and interictal epileptiform activity (IEA), brief bursts of neuronal activity recorded between epileptic events. ECoG is also performed following the resectioning surgery to detect any remaining epileptiform activity, and to determine the success of the surgery. Residual spikes on the ECoG, unaltered by the resection, indicate poor seizure control, and incomplete neutralization of the epileptogenic cortical zone. Additional surgery may be necessary to completely eradicate seizure activity. Extraoperative ECoG is also used to localize functionally-important areas (also known as eloquent cortex) to be preserved during epilepsy surgery. Motor, sensory, cognitive tasks during extraoperative ECoG are reported to increase the amplitude of high-frequency activity at 70–110 Hz in areas involved in execution of given tasks. Task-related high-frequency activity can animate 'when' and 'where' cerebral cortex is activated and inhibited in a 4D manner with a temporal resolution of 10 milliseconds or below and a spatial resolution of 10 mm or below.

Intraoperative ECoG

The objective of the resectioning surgery is to remove the epileptogenic tissue without causing unacceptable neurological consequences. In addition to identifying and localizing the extent of epileptogenic zones, ECoG used in conjunction with DCES is also a valuable tool for functional cortical mapping. It is vital to precisely localize critical brain structures, identifying which regions the surgeon must spare during resectioning (the "eloquent cortex") in order to preserve sensory processing, motor coordination, and speech. Functional mapping requires that the patient be able to interact with the surgeon, and thus is performed under local rather than general anesthesia. Electrical stimulation using cortical and acute depth electrodes is used to probe distinct regions of the cortex in order to identify centers of speech, somatosensory integration, and somatomotor processing. During the resectioning surgery, intraoperative ECoG may also be performed to monitor the epileptic activity of the tissue and ensure that the entire epileptogenic zone is resectioned.

Although the use of extraoperative and intraoperative ECoG in resectioning surgery has been an accepted clinical practice for several decades, recent studies have shown that the usefulness of this technique may vary based on the type of epilepsy a patient exhibits. Kuruvilla and Flink reported that while intraoperative ECoG plays a critical role in tailored temporal lobectomies, in multiple subpial transections (MST), and in the removal of malformations of cortical development (MCDs), it has been found impractical in standard resection of medial temporal lobe epilepsy (TLE) with MRI evidence of mesial temporal sclerosis (MTS). A study performed by Wennberg, Quesney, and Rasmussen demonstrated the presurgical significance of ECoG in frontal lobe epilepsy (FLE) cases.

== Research applications ==
ECoG has recently emerged as a promising recording technique for use in brain-computer interfaces (BCI). BCIs are direct neural interfaces that provide control of prosthetic, electronic, or communication devices via direct use of the individual's brain signals. Brain signals may be recorded either invasively, with recording devices implanted directly into the cortex, or noninvasively, using EEG scalp electrodes. ECoG serves to provide a partially invasive compromise between the two modalities – while ECoG does not penetrate the blood–brain barrier like more invasive recording devices, it features a higher spatial resolution and higher signal-to-noise ratio than EEG. ECoG has gained attention recently for decoding imagined speech or music, which could lead to "literal" BCIs in which users simply imagine words, sentences, or music that the BCI can directly interpret.

In addition to clinical applications to localize functional regions to support neurosurgery, real-time functional brain mapping with ECoG has gained attention to support research into fundamental questions in neuroscience. For example, a 2017 study explored regions within face and color processing areas and found that these subregions made highly specific contributions to different aspects of vision. Another study found that high-frequency activity from 70 to 200 Hz reflected processes associated with both transient and sustained decision-making. Other work based on ECoG presented a new approach to interpreting brain activity, suggesting that both power and phase jointly influence instantaneous voltage potential, which directly regulates cortical excitability. Like the work toward decoding imagined speech and music, these research directions involving real-time functional brain mapping also have implications for clinical practice, including both neurosurgery and BCI systems. The system that was used in most of these real-time functional mapping publications, "CortiQ". Archived from the original on 2019-05-11. has been used for both research and clinical applications.

== Recent advances ==
The electrocorticogram is still considered to be the "gold standard" for defining epileptogenic zones; however, this procedure is risky and highly invasive. Recent studies have explored the development of a noninvasive cortical imaging technique for presurgical planning that may provide similar information and resolution of the invasive ECoG.

In one novel approach, Lei Ding et al. seek to integrate the information provided by a structural MRI and scalp EEG to provide a noninvasive alternative to ECoG. This study investigated a high-resolution subspace source localization approach, FINE (first principle vectors) to image the locations and estimate the extents of current sources from the scalp EEG. A thresholding technique was applied to the resulting tomography of subspace correlation values in order to identify epileptogenic sources. This method was tested in three pediatric patients with intractable epilepsy, with encouraging clinical results. Each patient was evaluated using structural MRI, long-term video EEG monitoring with scalp electrodes, and subsequently with subdural electrodes. The ECoG data were then recorded from implanted subdural electrode grids placed directly on the surface of the cortex. MRI and computed tomography images were also obtained for each subject.

The epileptogenic zones identified from preoperative EEG data were validated by observations from postoperative ECoG data in all three patients. These preliminary results suggest that it is possible to direct surgical planning and locate epileptogenic zones noninvasively using the described imaging and integrating methods. EEG findings were further validated by the surgical outcomes of all three patients. After surgical resectioning, two patients are seizure-free and the third has experienced a significant reduction in seizures. Due to its clinical success, FINE offers a promising alternative to preoperative ECoG, providing information about both the location and extent of epileptogenic sources through a noninvasive imaging procedure.

== See also ==
- Brain–computer interface
- Electroencephalogram
- Epilepsy
- Magnetic Resonance Imaging
- Herbert Jasper
- Wilder Penfield
