= Brain implant =

Device that connects to a brain

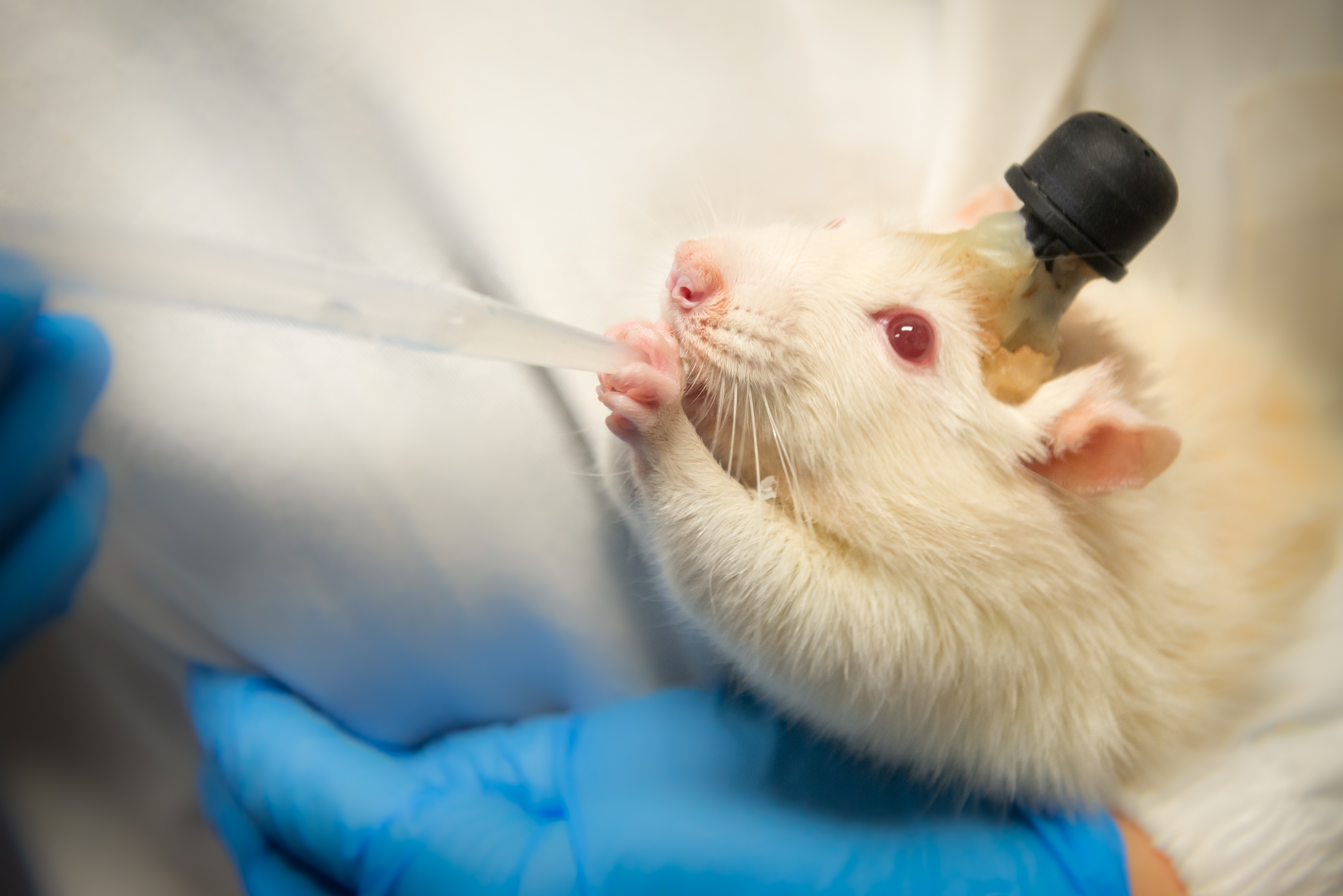
A laboratory rat with a brain implant

Brain implants, often referred to as neural implants, are technological devices that connect directly to a biological subject's brain – usually placed on the surface of the brain, or attached to the brain's cortex. A common purpose of modern brain implants and the focus of much current research is establishing a biomedical prosthesis circumventing areas in the brain that have become dysfunctional after a stroke or other head injuries. This includes sensory substitution, e.g., in vision. Other brain implants are used in animal experiments simply to record brain activity for scientific reasons. Some brain implants involve creating interfaces between neural systems and computer chips. This work is part of a wider research field called brain–computer interfaces. (Brain–computer interface research also includes technology such as EEG arrays that allow interface between mind and machine but do not require direct implantation of a device.)

Neural implants such as deep brain stimulation and vagus nerve stimulation are increasingly becoming routine for patients with Parkinson's disease and clinical depression, respectively.

== Purpose ==
Brain implants electrically stimulate, block or record (or both record and stimulate simultaneously) signals from single neurons or groups of neurons (biological neural networks) in the brain. This can only be done where the functional associations of these neurons are approximately known. Because of the complexity of neural processing and the lack of access to action potential related signals using neuroimaging techniques, the application of brain implants has been seriously limited until recent advances in neurophysiology and computer processing power. Much research is also being done on the surface chemistry of neural implants in effort to design products which minimize all negative effects that an active implant can have on the brain, and that the body can have on the function of the implant. Researchers are also exploring a range of delivery systems, such as using veins, to deliver these implants without brain surgery; by leaving the skull sealed shut, patients could receive their neural implants without running as great a risk of seizures, strokes, or permanent neural impairments, all of which can be caused by open-brain surgery.

== Research and applications ==
Research in sensory substitution has made significant progress since 1970. Especially in vision, due to the knowledge of the working of the visual system, eye implants (often involving some brain implants or monitoring) have been applied with demonstrated success. For hearing, cochlear implants are used to stimulate the auditory nerve directly. The vestibulocochlear nerve is part of the peripheral nervous system, but the interface is similar to that of true brain implants.

Multiple projects have demonstrated success at recording from the brains of animals for long periods of time. As early as 1976, researchers at the NIH led by Edward Schmidt made action potential recordings of signals from rhesus monkey motor cortexes using immovable "hatpin" electrodes, including recording from single neurons for over 30 days, and consistent recordings for greater than three years from the best electrodes.

The "hatpin" electrodes were made of pure iridium and insulated with parylene, materials that are currently used in the cyberkinetics implementation of the Utah array. These same electrodes, or derivations thereof using the same biocompatible electrode materials, are currently used in visual prosthetics laboratories, laboratories studying the neural basis of learning, and motor prosthetics approaches other than the cyberkinetics probes.

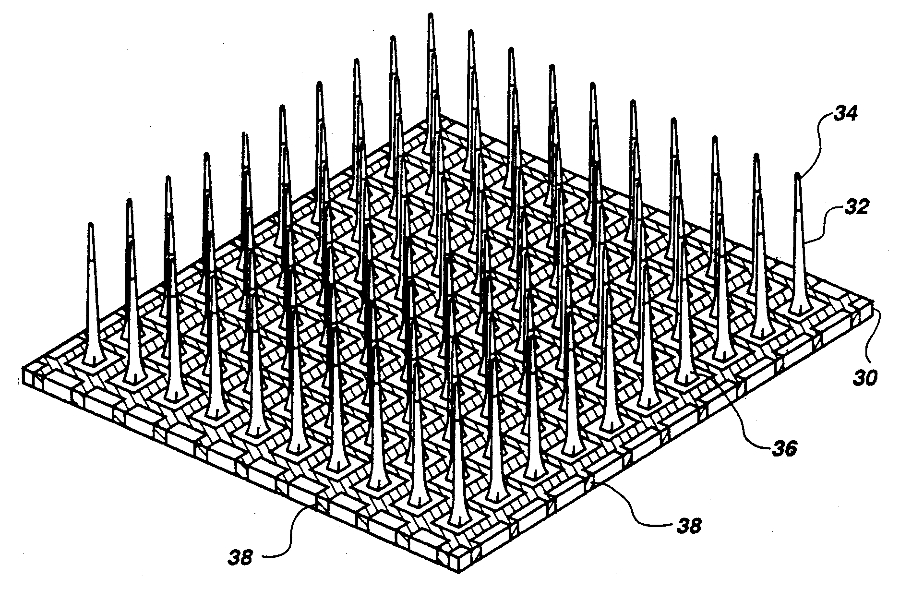
Schematic of the "Utah" Electrode Array

Other laboratory groups produce their own implants to provide unique capabilities not available from the commercial products.

Breakthroughs include: studies of the process of functional brain re-wiring throughout the learning of a sensory discrimination, control of physical devices by rat brains, monkeys over robotic arms, remote control of mechanical devices by monkeys and humans, remote control over the movements of roaches, the first reported use of the Utah Array in a human for bidirectional signaling. Currently a number of groups are conducting preliminary motor prosthetic implants in humans. These studies are presently limited to several months by the longevity of the implants. The array now forms the sensor component of the Braingate.

Much research is also being done on the surface chemistry of neural implants in effort to design products which minimize all negative effects that an active implant can have on the brain, and that the body can have on the function of the implant.

Another type of neural implant that is being experimented on is prosthetic neuronal memory silicon chips, which imitate the signal processing done by functioning neurons that allows peoples' brains to create long-term memories.

For implants, potentially including brain implants, all-organic devices could be advantageous because they could be biocompatible. If organic neuromorphic devices reach that point, "implants could allow humans to control powered exoskeletons" for example. Genetically modified neurons may enable connecting external components – such as prosthetic limbs – to nerves. There also is research of potentially implantable physical artificial neurons.

There is research of potential implants for drug delivery to the brain.

In 2016, scientists at the University of Illinois at Urbana–Champaign announced development of tiny brain sensors for use postoperative monitoring, which melt away when they are no longer needed.

In 2020, scientists out of the University of Melbourne, who formed the company Synchron in 2016, published clinical data related to a discovery for Stentrode, a device implanted via the jugular vein, without the need for open brain surgery. The technology was shown to enable two patients to control a computer using thought alone. It may ultimately help diagnose and treat a range of brain pathologies, such as epilepsy and Parkinson's disease. In 2023, researchers reported no serious adverse events during the first year in all four patients who used the device to operate a computer.

In 2026, a blind patient that had suffered an optic nerve injury partially regained vision after scientists from the Miguel Hernández University of Elche stimulated the visual cortex of the patient using implanted electrodes that sent electrical signals received from special glasses directly to the patient's brain until he was able to perceive light, characters, and movement.

=== Military ===
DARPA has announced its interest in developing "cyborg insects" to transmit data from sensors implanted into the insect during the pupal stage. The insect's motion would be controlled from a Micro-Electro-Mechanical System (MEMS) and could conceivably survey an environment or detect explosives and gas. Similarly, DARPA is developing a neural implant to remotely control the movement of sharks. The shark's unique senses would then be exploited to provide data feedback in relation to enemy ship movement or underwater explosives.

In 2006, researchers at Cornell University invented a new surgical procedure to implant artificial structures into insects during their metamorphic development. The first insect cyborgs, moths with integrated electronics in their thorax, were demonstrated by the same researchers. The initial success of the techniques has resulted in increased research and the creation of a program called Hybrid-Insect-MEMS, HI-MEMS. Its goal, according to DARPA's Microsystems Technology Office, is to develop "tightly coupled machine-insect interfaces by placing micro-mechanical systems inside the insects during the early stages of metamorphosis".

The use of neural implants has recently been attempted, with success, on cockroaches. Surgically applied electrodes were put on the insect, which were remotely controlled by a human. The results, although sometimes different, basically showed that the cockroach could be controlled by the impulses it received through the electrodes. DARPA is now funding this research because of its obvious beneficial applications to the military and other areas

In 2009 at the Institute of Electrical and Electronics Engineers (IEEE) Micro-electronic mechanical systems (MEMS) conference in Italy, researchers demonstrated the first "wireless" flying-beetle cyborg. Engineers at the University of California at Berkeley pioneered the design of a "remote controlled beetle", funded by the DARPA HI-MEMS Program. This was followed later that year by the demonstration of wireless control of a "lift-assisted" moth-cyborg.

Eventually researchers plan to develop HI-MEMS for dragonflies, bees, rats and pigeons. For the HI-MEMS cybernetic bug to be considered a success, it must fly 100 metres (330 ft) from a starting point, guided via computer into a controlled landing within 5 metres (16 ft) of a specific end point. Once landed, the cybernetic bug must remain in place.

In 2012, DARPA provided seed funding to Dr. Thomas Oxley, a neurointerventionist at Mount Sinai Hospital in New York City, for a technology that became known as Stentrode. Oxley's group in Australia was the only non-US-based funded by DARPA as part of the Reliable Neural Interface Technology (RE-NET) program. This technology is the first to attempt to provide neural implants through a minimally invasive surgical procedure that does not require cutting into the skull. That is, an electrode array built onto a self-expanding stent, implanted into the brain via cerebral angiography. This pathway can provide safe, easy access and capture a strong signal for a number of indications beyond addressing paralysis, and is currently in clinical trials in patients with severe paralysis seeking to regain the ability to communicate.

In 2015 it was reported that scientists from the Perception and Recognition Neuro-technologies Laboratory at the Southern Federal University in Rostov-on-Don suggested using rats with microchips planted in their brains to detect explosive devices.

In 2016 it was reported that American engineers are developing a system that would transform locusts into "remote controlled explosive detectors" with electrodes in their brains beaming information about dangerous substances back to their operators.

== Rehabilitation ==
Neurostimulators have been in use since 1997 to ease the symptoms of such diseases as epilepsy, Parkinson's disease, dystonia and recently depression. Rapid advancements in neurostimulation technologies are providing relief to an unprecedented number of patients affected by debilitating neurologic and psychiatric disorders. Neurostimulation therapies include invasive and noninvasive approaches that involve the application of electrical stimulation to drive neural function within a circuit.

Brain implants are also being explored by DARPA as part of the Reliable Neural-Interface Technology (RE-NET) program launched in 2010 to directly address the need for high-performance neural interfaces to control the dexterous functions made possible by DARPA's advanced prosthetic limbs. The goal is to provide high-bandwidth, intuitive control interface for these limbs.

Individuals and companies exploring brain–computer interface include: Elon Musk, Bill Gates, Mark Zuckerberg, Jeff Bezos, Neuralink, CTRL Labs, and Synchron.

Current brain implants are made from a variety of materials such as tungsten, silicon, platinum-iridium, or even stainless steel. Future brain implants may make use of more exotic materials such as nanoscale carbon fibers (nanotubes), and polycarbonate urethane. Nearly all implants require open brain surgery, but, in 2019, a company called Synchron was able to successfully implant a brain–computer interface via the blood vessels.

There have been a number of advances in technological spinal cord injury treatment, including the use of implants that provided a “digital bridge” between the brain and the spinal cord. In a study published in May 2023 in the journal Nature, researchers in Switzerland described such implants which allowed a 40-year-old man, paralyzed from the hips down for 12 years, to stand, walk and ascend a steep ramp with only the assistance of a walker. More than a year after the implant was inserted, he has retained these abilities and could walk with crutches even when the implant was switched off. It turns out that walking with the implant has encouraged the recovery of neurological function beyond what prior traditional rehabilitation had done.

== Historical research ==
In 1870, Eduard Hitzig and Gustav Fritsch demonstrated that electrical stimulation of the brains of dogs could produce movements. Robert Bartholow showed the same to be true for humans in 1874. By the start of the 20th century, Fedor Krause began to systematically map human brain areas, using patients that had undergone brain surgery.

Prominent research was conducted in the 1950s. Robert G. Heath experimented with mental patients, aiming to influence his subjects' moods through electrical stimulation.

Yale University physiologist Jose Delgado demonstrated limited control of animal and human subjects' behaviours using electronic stimulation. He invented the stimoceiver or transdermal stimulator, a device implanted in the brain to transmit electrical impulses that modify basic behaviours such as aggression or sensations of pleasure.

Delgado was later to write a popular book on mind control, called Physical Control of the Mind, where he stated: "the feasibility of remote control of activities in several species of animals has been demonstrated [...] The ultimate objective of this research is to provide an understanding of the mechanisms involved in the directional control of animals and to provide practical systems suitable for human application."

In the 1950s, the CIA also funded research into mind control techniques, through programs such as MKULTRA. Perhaps because he received funding for some research through the US Office of Naval Research, it has been suggested (but not proven) that Delgado also received backing through the CIA. He denied this claim in a 2005 article in Scientific American describing it only as a speculation by conspiracy-theorists. He stated that his research was only progressively scientifically motivated to understand how the brain works.

Current research is focused on enabling paralyzed patients to move external devices through thought as well as facilitating thought-to-text capability in this population.

In 2012, a landmark study in Nature, led by pioneer Leigh Hochberg, MD, PhD, demonstrated that two people with tetraplegia were able to control robotic arms through thought when connected to the BrainGate neural interface system. The two participants were able to reach for and grasp objects in three-dimensional space, and one participant used the system to serve herself coffee for the first time since becoming paralyzed nearly 15 years prior.

In October 2020, two patients were able to wirelessly control a Surface Book 2 running Windows 10 to text, email, shop and bank using direct thought through the Stentrode brain computer interface. This was the first time a brain–computer interface was implanted via the patient's blood vessels, eliminating the need for open-brain surgery.

== Concerns and ethical considerations ==
Ethical questions raised include who are good candidates to receive neural implants and what are good and bad uses of neural implants. Whilst deep brain stimulation is increasingly becoming routine for patients with Parkinson's disease, there may be some behavioural side effects. Reports in the literature describe the possibility of apathy, hallucinations, compulsive gambling, hypersexuality, cognitive dysfunction, and depression. However, these may be temporary and related to correct placement and calibration of the stimulator and so are potentially reversible.

Some transhumanists, such as Ray Kurzweil and Kevin Warwick, see brain implants as part of the next step for humans in progress and evolution, whereas others, especially bioconservatives, view them as unnatural, with humankind losing essential human qualities. It raises controversy similar to other forms of human enhancement. For instance, it is argued that implants would technically change people into cybernetic organisms (cyborgs). It is also expected that all research will comply with the Declaration of Helsinki. Yet further, the usual legal duties apply such as information to the person wearing implants and that the implants are voluntary, with (very) few exceptions.

Other concerns involve vulnerabilities of neural implants to cybercrime or intrusive surveillance as neural implants could be hacked, misused, or misdesigned.

Sadja states that "one's private thoughts are important to protect" and does not consider it a good idea to just charge the government or any company with protecting them. Walter Glannon, a neuroethicist of the University of Calgary notes that "there is a risk of the microchips being hacked by third parties" and that "this could interfere with the user's intention to perform actions, violate privacy by extracting information from the chip".

== In fiction and philosophy ==
Brain implants are now part of modern culture but there were early philosophical references of relevance as far back as René Descartes.

In his 1641 Meditations, Descartes argued that it would be impossible to tell if all one's apparently real experiences were in fact being produced by an evil demon intent on deception. A modern twist on Descartes's argument is provided by the "brain in a vat" thought experiment, which imagines a brain, sustained apart from its body in a vat of nutrients, and hooked up to a computer which is capable of stimulating it in such a way as to produce the illusion that everything is normal.

Popular science fiction discussing brain implants and mind control became widespread in the 20th century, often with a dystopian outlook. Literature in the 1970s delved into the topic, including The Terminal Man by Michael Crichton, where a man with brain damage receives an experimental surgical brain implant designed to prevent seizures, which he abuses by triggering for pleasure. Another example is Larry Niven's science fiction writing of wire-heads in his "Known Space" stories.

A somewhat more positive view of brain implants used to communicate with a computer as a form of augmented intelligence is seen in Algis Budrys 1976 novel Michaelmas.

Fear that the technology will be misused by the government and military is an early theme. In the 1981 BBC serial The Nightmare Man the pilot of a high-tech mini submarine is linked to his craft via a brain implant but becomes a savage killer after ripping out the implant.

Perhaps the most influential novel exploring the world of brain implants was William Gibson's 1984 novel Neuromancer. This was the first novel in a genre that came to be known as "cyberpunk". It follows a computer hacker through a world where mercenaries are augmented with brain implants to enhance strength, vision, memory, etc. Gibson coins the term "matrix" and introduces the concept of "jacking in" with head electrodes or direct implants. He also explores possible entertainment applications of brain implants such as the "simstim" (simulated stimulation) which is a device used to record and playback experiences.

Gibson's work led to an explosion in popular culture references to brain implants. Its influences are felt, for example, in the 1989 roleplaying game Shadowrun, which borrowed his term "datajack" to describe a brain–computer interface. The implants in Gibson's novels and short stories formed the template for the 1995 film Johnny Mnemonic and later, The Matrix Trilogy.

Pulp fiction with implants or brain implants include the novel series Typers, film Spider-Man 2, the TV series Earth: Final Conflict, and numerous computer/video games.

- The Gap Cycle (The Gap into): In Stephen R. Donaldson's series of novels, the use (and misuse) of "zone implant" technology is key to several plotlines.
- Ghost in the Shell anime and manga franchise: Cyberbrain neural augmentation technology is the focus. Implants of powerful computers provide vastly increased memory capacity, total recall, as well as the ability to view his or her own memories on an external viewing device. Users can also initiate a telepathic conversation with other cyberbrain users, the downsides being cyberbrain hacking, malicious memory alteration, and the deliberate distortion of subjective reality and experience.
- In Larry Niven and Jerry Pournelle's Oath of Fealty (1981) an arcology with high surveillance and feudal-like society is built by a private company due to riots around Los Angeles. Its systems are run by MILLIE, an advanced computer system, with some high-level executives being able to communicate directly with it and given omniscience of the arcology's workings via expensive implants in their brains.

=== Film ===
- Brainstorm (1983): The military tries to take control over a new technology that can record and transfer thoughts, feelings, and sensations.
- RoboCop (1987) Science fiction action film. Police officer Alex Murphy is murdered and revived as a superhuman cyborg law enforcer.
- Johnny Mnemonic (1995): The main character acts as a "mnemonic courier" by way of a storage implant in his brain, allowing him to carry sensitive information undetected between parties.
- The Manchurian Candidate (2004): For a means of mind control, the presidential hopeful Raymond Shaw unknowingly has a chip implanted in his head by Manchurian Global, a fictional geopolitical organization aimed at making parts of the government sleeper cells, or puppets for their monetary advancement.
- Hardwired (2009): A corporation attempting to bring marketing to the next level implants a chip into main character's brain.
- Terminator Salvation (2009): A character named Marcus Wright discovers he is a Cyborg and must choose to fight for humans or an evil Artificial intelligence.

=== Television ===
- The Happiness Cage (1972) A German scientist works on a way of quelling overly aggressive soldiers by developing implants that directly stimulate the pleasure centers of the brain. Also known as The Mind Snatchers.
- Six Million Dollar Man (1974 to 1978) Steve Austin has an accident and is rebuilt as a cyborg.
- The Bionic Woman (1976 to 1978) Jaime Sommers has an accident and is rebuilt as a cyborg.
- Blake's 7: Olag Gan, a character, has a brain implant which is supposed to prevent future aggression after being convicted of killing an officer from the oppressive Federation.
- Dark Angel: The notorious Red Series use neuro-implants pushed into their brain stem at the base of their skull to amp them up and hyper-adrenalize them and make them almost unstoppable. Unfortunately the effects of the implant burn out their system after six months to a year and kill them.
- The X-Files (episode:Duane Barry, relevant to the overreaching mytharc of the series.): FBI Agent Dana Scully discovers an implant set under the skin at the back of her neck which can read her every thought and change memory through electrical signals that alter the brain chemistry.
- Star Trek franchise: Members of the Borg collective are equipped with brain implants which connect them to the Borg collective consciousness.
- Stargate SG-1 franchise: Advanced replicators, the Asuran interface with humans by inserting their hand into the brain of humans.
- Stargate SG-1 franchise: Stargate SG-1 (season 7). Episode #705. Title "Revisions". A computer network linked to all the brains of the inhabitants. The A.I. in the interface has the ability to erase and rewrite history and does so.
- Fringe: The Observers use a needle like, self-guided implant which allows them to read the minds of others at the expense of emotion. The implant also allows for short range teleportation and increases intelligence.
- Person of Interest, Season 4. Episode 81 or 13. Title "M.I.A". One of many innocent people who Samaritan operatives are experimenting on with neural implants.
- Brain implants appear in several episodes of The Outer Limits: in the episode "Straight and Narrow", students are forced to have brain implants and are controlled by them. In "The Message", a character named Jennifer Winter receives a brain implant to hear. In "Living Hell", a character named Ben Kohler receives a brain implant to save his life. And in "Judgment Day", a character who is judged a criminal has a chip implanted on the medulla oblongata of the lower brainstem. The forcibly implanted chip induces overwhelming pain and disorientation by a remote control within range. In the episode "Awakening", season three, episode 10, a neurologically impaired woman receives a brain implant to help her become more like a typical human.
- Black Mirror, a British science fiction television anthology series, has several episodes in which characters have implants on their head or in their brain or eyes, providing video recording and playback, augmented reality, and communication.
- Earth: Final Conflict, in season 1, episode 12, named "Sandoval's Run", the character named Sandoval experiences the breakdown of his brain implant.
- Earth: Final Conflict, in season 4, episode 12, named "The Summit", the character named Liam is implanted with a neural surveillance device.

=== Video games ===
- In the video games PlanetSide, PlanetSide 2 and Chrome, players can use implants to improve their aim, run faster, and see better, along with other enhancements.
- The Deus Ex video game series addresses the nature and impact of human enhancement with regard to a wide variety of prosthesis and brain implants. Deus Ex: Human Revolution, set in 2027, details the impact on society of human augmentation and the controversy it could generate. Several characters in the game have implanted neurochips to aid their professions (or their whims). Examples are of a helicopter pilot with implanted chips to better pilot her aircraft and analyse flight paths, velocity and spatial awareness, a CEO getting an artificial arm to throw a baseball better, as well as a hacker with a brain–computer interface that allows direct access to computer networks and also to act as a 'human proxy' to allow an individual in a remote location to control his actions.

The game raises the question of the downsides of this kind of augmentation as those who cannot afford the enhancements (or object to getting them) rapidly find themselves at a serious disadvantage against people with artificial enhancement of their abilities. The spectre of being forced to have mechanical or electronic enhancements just to get a job is explored as well. The storyline addresses the effect of implant rejection by use of the fictional drug 'Neuropozyne' which breaks down glial tissue and is also fiercely addictive, leaving people who have augmentations little choice but to continue buying the drug from a single biotech corporation who controls the price of it. Without the drug augmented people experience rejection of implants (along with ensuing loss of implant functionality), crippling pain, and possible death.

- In the video game AI: The Somnium Files, a direct neural interface is used to invasively interface the thoughts and dreams of two individuals to the extent that one person could forcibly extract information from another person's brain. Although the ethics of it are not discussed much, the significant concerns presented by this sort of technology, such as blending of the minds of connected individuals or trading thereof, and forced invasive interfacing are brought up and form part of the core narrative.
- The game Cyberpunk 2077, developed by CD Projekt Red, includes examples of brain augmentation implants.

== See also ==
- Auditory brainstem implant (ABI)
- Hippocampal prosthesis
- History of neuroimaging
- Nanotechnology
- Neuroprosthetics
- Neurotechnology
- Transhumanism
- Wirehead
- Reversible charge injection limit
- Responsive neurostimulation device
