= Nicholas Opie =

Australian biomedical engineer

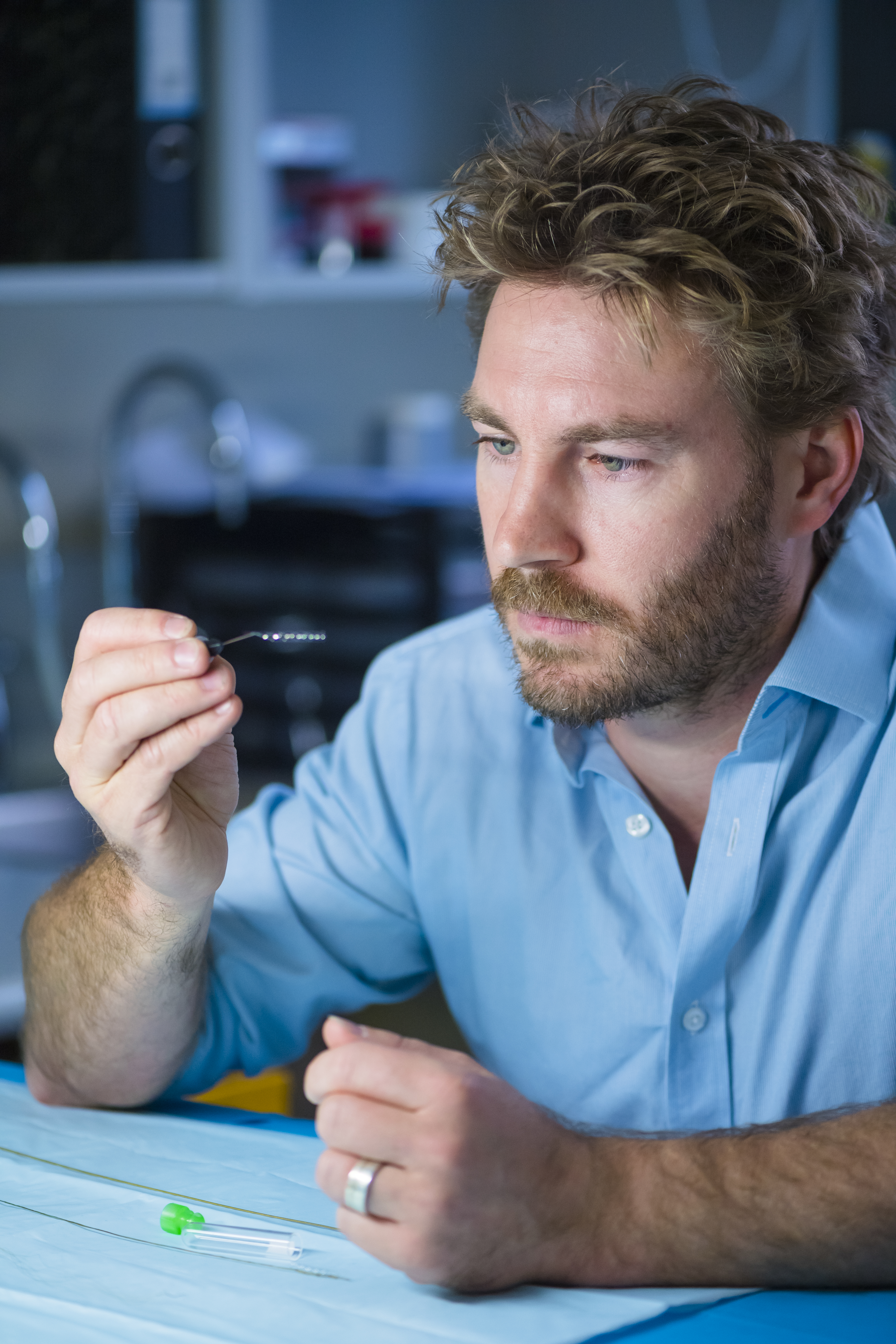
Nicholas Opie

Nicholas Opie is an Australian biomedical engineer who co-founded Synchron in 2012. He invented the Stentrode alongside Thomas Oxley. Opie serves as the head of Vascular Bonic Laboratory at the University of Melbourne. He was elected a Fellow of the Australian Academy of Technological Sciences & Engineering in 2026.
