= Hippocampal prosthesis =

Type of cognitive prosthesis

A hippocampus prosthesis is a type of cognitive prosthesis (a prosthesis implanted into the nervous system in order to improve or replace the function of damaged brain tissue). Prosthetic devices replace normal function of a damaged body part; this can be simply a structural replacement (e.g. reconstructive surgery or glass eye) or a rudimentary, functional replacement (e.g., a pegleg or hook).

However, prosthetics involving the brain have some special categories and requirements. "Input" prosthetics, such as retinal or cochlear implant, supply signals to the brain that the patient eventually learns to interpret as sight or sound. "Output" prosthetics use brain signals to drive a bionic arm, hand or computer device, and require considerable training during which the patient learns to generate the desired action via their thoughts. Both of these types of prosthetics rely on the plasticity of the brain to adapt to the requirement of the prosthesis, thus allowing the user to "learn" the use of his new body part.

A cognitive or "brain-to-brain" prosthesis involves neither learned input nor output signals, but the native signals used normally by the area of the brain to be replaced (or supported). Thus, such a device must be able to fully replace the function of a small section of the nervous system—using that section's normal mode of operation. In order to achieve this, developers require a deep understanding of the functioning of the nervous system. The scope of design must include a reliable mathematical model as well as the technology in order to properly manufacture and install a cognitive prosthesis. The primary goal of an artificial hippocampus is to provide a cure for Alzheimer's disease and other hippocampus—related problems. To do so, the prosthesis has to be able to receive information directly from the brain, analyze the information and give an appropriate output to the cerebral cortex; in other words, it must behave just like a natural hippocampus. At the same time, the artificial organ must be completely autonomous, since any exterior power source will greatly increase the risk of infection.

== Hippocampus ==
=== Role ===
The hippocampus is part of the human limbic system, which interacts with the neocortex and other parts of the brain to produce emotions. As a part of the limbic system, the hippocampus plays its part in the formation of emotion in addition to its other roles, such as consolidation of new memories, navigation, and spatial orientation. The hippocampus is responsible for the formation of long term recognition memories. In other words, this is the part of the brain that allows us to associate a face with a name. Because of its close relationship with memory formation, damage to the hippocampus is closely related to Alzheimer's disease.

=== Anatomy ===
The hippocampus is a bilateral structure, situated under the neocortex. Each hippocampus is "composed of several different subsystem[s] that form a closed feedback loop, with input from the neocortex entering via the entorhinal cortex, propagating through the intrinsic subregions of the hippocampus and returning to the neocortex." In an electronic sense, the hippocampus is composed of a slice of parallel circuits.

== Essential requirements ==
=== Biocompatibility ===
Since the prosthesis will be permanently implanted inside the brain, long term biocompatibility is required. We must also take into account the tendency for supporting braincells like astrocytes to encapsulate the implant. (This is a natural response for braincells, in order to protect neurons), thus impairing its function.

=== Bio-mimetic ===
Being biomimetic requires the implant to replicate the fundamental properties of a biological neuron. This necessitates a precise mathematical model grounded in a comprehensive understanding of neural behavior—an endeavor where the field of computational neuroscience has already established a strong foundation.

First, we must take into account that, like most of biological processes, the behaviors of neurons are highly nonlinear and depend on many factors: input frequency patterns, etc. Also, a good model must take into account the fact that the expression of a single nerve cell is negligible, since the processes are carried by groups of neurons interacting in network. Once installed, the device must assume all (or at least most) of the function of the damaged hippocampus for a prolonged period of time. First, the artificial neurons must be able to work together in network just like real neurons. Then, they must be able, working and effective synaptic connections with the existing neurons of the brain; therefore a model for silicon/neurons interface will be required.

=== Size ===
The implant must be small enough to be implantable while minimizing collateral damage during and after the implantation.

=== Bidirectional communication ===
In order to fully assume the function of the damaged hippocampus, the prosthesis must be able to communicate with the existing tissue in a bidirectional manner. in other words, the implant must be able to receive information from the brain and give an appropriate and compressible feedback to the surrounding nerve cell.

=== Personalized ===
The structural and functional characteristic of the brain varies greatly between individuals; therefore any neural implant has to be specific to each individual, which requires a precise model of the hippocampus and the use of advanced brain imagery to determine individual variance.

=== Surgical requirement ===
Since the prosthesis will be installed inside the brain, the operation itself will be much like a tumor removal operation. Although collateral damage will be inevitable, the effect on the patient will be minimal.

== Model ==
"In order to incorporate the nonlinear dynamics of biological neurons into neuron models to develop a prosthesis, it is first necessary to measure them accurately. We have developed and applied methods for quantifying the nonlinear dynamics of hippocampal neurons (Berger et al., 1988a,b, 1991, 1992, 1994; Dalal et al., 1997) using principles of nonlinear systems theory (Lee and Schetzen, 1965; Krausz, 1975; P. Z. Marmarelis and Marmarelis, 1978; Rugh, 1981; Sclabassi et al., 1988). In this approach, properties of neurons are assessed experimentally by applying a random interval train of electrical impulses as an input and electrophysiologically recording the evoked output of the target neuron during stimulation (figure 12.2A). The input train consists of a series of impulses (as many as 4064), with interimpulse intervals varying according to a Poisson process having a mean of 500 ms and a range of 0.2–5000 ms. Thus, the input is "broadband" and stimulates the neuron over most of its operating range; that is, the statistical properties of the random train are highly consistent with the known physiological properties of hippocampal neurons. Nonlinear response properties are expressed in terms of the relation between progressively higher-order temporal properties of a sequence of input events and the probability of neuronal output, and are modeled as the kernels of a functional power series."

== Technology involved ==
=== Imaging ===
Technology such as EEG, MEG, fMRI and other type of imaging technology are essential to the installation of the implant, which requires a high precision in order to minimize collateral damage (since the hippocampus is situated inside the cortex), as well as the proper function of the device.

=== Silicon/neuron interface ===
A silicon/neuron interface will be needed for the proper interaction of the silicon neurons of the prosthesis and the biological neurons of the brain.

=== Neuron network processor ===
In the brain, tasks are carried out by groups of interconnected neuronal network rather than a single cell, which means that any prosthesis must be able to simulate this network behavior. To do so, we will need a high number and density of silicon neurons to produce an effective prosthesis; therefore, a High-density Hippocampal Neuron Network Processor will be required in order for the prosthesis to carry out the task of a biological hippocampus. In addition, a neuron/silicon interface will be essential to the bidirectional communication of the implanted prosthesis. The choice of material and the design must ensure long term viability and bio compatibility while ensuring the density and the specificity of the interconnections.

=== Power supply ===
Appropriate power supply is still a major issue for any neural implant. Because the prostheses are implanted inside the brain, long term biocompatibility aside, the power supply will require several specification. First, the power supply must be self recharging. Unlike other prostheses, infection is a much greater issue for neural implant, due to the sensitivity of the brain; therefore an external power source is not envisagable. Because the brain is also highly heat sensitive, the power and the device itself must not generate too much heat to avoid disrupting brain function.

== Prosthetic neuronal memory silicon chips ==
A prosthetic neuronal memory silicon chip is a device that imitates the brain's process of creating long-term memories. A prototype for this device was designed by Theodore Berger, a biomedical engineer and neurologist at University of Southern California. Berger published a paper discussing the device in 2010 and showcased the devices use in a rat model in 2011, with many more publications since . He partnered with research colleagues that have been able to implant electrodes into rats and monkeys to test restoration of memory function. Recent work shows that the system can form long-term memories in many different behavioral situations. Berger and colleagues hope to eventually use these chips as electronic implants for humans whose brains that suffer from diseases such as Alzheimer's that disrupt neuronal networks.

=== Technology and medical application ===
To begin making a brain prosthesis, Berger and his collaborator Vasilis Marmarelis, a biomedical engineer at USC, worked with the hippocampus slices of rats. Since they knew that neuronal signals travel from one side of the hippocampus to the other, the researchers sent random pulses into the hippocampus, recorded the signals at specific locales to see how they were changed, and then derived equations representing the changes. They then programmed those equations into the computer chips.

Next, they had to determine whether a chip could be used as a prosthesis, or implant, for a damaged region in the hippocampus. To do this, they had to figure out whether they could avoid a central component of the pathway in the brain slices. They put electrodes in the region, which carried electrical pulses to an external chip. The chip then executed the transformations that are normally carried out in the hippocampus, and other electrodes sent the signals back to the slice of brain.

== Memory codes ==
In 1995, Dr. Sam A. Deadwyler and Robert E. Hampson of Wake Forest University School of Medicine in Winston-Salem, NC, studied the activity patterns of collections of hippocampal neurons while rats performed a task requiring short-term memory. These 'ensembles' or collections of neurons fired in different patterns in both time and 'space' (in this case, space referred to different neurons distributed throughout the hippocampus) depending on the type of behavior required in the task. More importantly, Deadwyler and Hampson could identify patterns that clearly distinguished between the various stimuli in the task including position (similar to place cells), behavioral responses, and what part of the task was occurring. Analyses based on the neural ensemble activity alone without looking at those variables could identify and even 'predict' some of those variables even before they occurred. In fact, the patterns would even identify when the rat was about to make an error in the task. Over the following ten years, Deadwyler and Hampson's laboratory refined the analysis to identify the 'codes' and improved the ability to predict correct and error responses, even to the point of being able to have untrained rats perform the memory task using hippocampal stimulation with codes obtained from fully trained rats. The discovery of the memory codes in hippocampus led Deadwyler and Hampson to join efforts with Berger for future studies in which Berger's team would develop models of memory function in hippocampus, and Deadwyler's team would test the models in rats and monkeys, and eventually move into human studies.

=== Trials on rats and monkeys ===
To transition to awake, behaving animals, Berger partnered with Deadwyler and Hampson of WFUSM to test a prototype of the memory prosthetic connected to rat and monkey brains via electrodes to analyze information just like the actual hippocampus. The prosthetic model allowed even a damaged hippocampus to generate new memories. In one demonstration, Hampson and Deadwyler impaired the rats' ability to form long-term memories by using pharmacological agents. These disrupted the neural circuitry that transfers messages between two subregions of the hippocampus. These subregions, CA1 and CA3, interact to create long-term memories. The rats were unable to remember which lever they needed to pull to obtain the reward. The researchers then developed an artificial hippocampus that could duplicate the pattern of interaction between CA3-CA1 interactions by analyzing the neural spikes in the cells with an electrode array, and then playing back the same pattern on the same array. After stimulating the rat hippocampi using the mathematical model of the prosthesis, their ability to identify the correct lever to pull improved dramatically. This artificial hippocampus played a significant role in the developmental stage of a memory prosthetic, as it went on to show that if a prosthetic device and its associated electrodes were implanted in the animals with a malfunctioning hippocampus, the device could potentially restore the memory capability to that of normal rats.

=== Goals for the future ===
The research teams at USC and Wake Forest are working to possibly make this system applicable to humans whose brains suffer damage from Alzheimer's, stroke, or injury, the disruption of neural networks often stops long-term memories from forming. The system designed by Berger and implemented by Deadwyler and Hampson allows the signal processing to take place that would occur naturally in undamaged neurons. Ultimately, they hope to restore the ability to create long-term memories by implanting chips such as these into the brain.

== Recent development ==
Theodore Berger and his colleagues at the University of Southern California in Los Angeles have developed a working hippocampal prosthesis that passed the live tissue test in slices of brain tissue in 2004. In 2011. Drs. Sam A. Deadwyler and Robert E. Hampson at Wake Forest University School of Medicine, successfully tested a proof-of-concept prosthesis, using Berger's hippocampal model, in awake, behaving rats. The prosthesis was in the form of multisite electrodes positioned to record from both the input and output "sides" of the damaged hippocampus, the input is gathered and analyzed by external computation chips, an appropriate feedback is computed, then used to stimulate the appropriate output pattern in the brain so that the prosthesis functioned like a real hippocampus. In 2012, the team tested a further implementation in macaques prefrontal cortex, further developing the neural prosthesis technology. In 2013, Hampson et al. successfully tested a hippocampal prosthesis on non-human primates. While the device does not yet consist of a fully implantable "chip," these tests, from rat to monkey, demonstrate the effectiveness of the device as a neural prosthetic, and supports application to human trials.

=== Proof of concept for a human hippocampal prosthetic ===
In 2018, the team led by Robert E. Hampson at Wake Forest University School of Medicine, and including Berger and Deadwyler, became the first to demonstrate effectiveness of the prosthetic model in human patients. The subjects underwent implantation of electrodes in the brain at Wake Forest as part of a medical diagnostic procedure for epilepsy. While in the hospital, patients with electrodes in hippocampus volunteered to perform a memory task on computer while hippocampal neural activity was recorded in order for Berger and his team at USC team to customize the hippocampal prosthetic model for that patient. With model in hand, the Wake Forest team was able to demonstrate up to 37% improvement in memory function in patients with memory impaired by disease. The improvement was demonstrated for memories up to 75 minutes after stimulation by the hippocampal prosthetic model. As of 2022, Hampson and colleague Brent M. Roeder are continuing studies utilizing memory codes for memory restoration following traumatic brain injury, as well as whether encoding additional attributes and features of items to be remembered also increases memory facilitation for those features.

== See also ==
- Brain implant
- Neural engineering
