= Stent-electrode recording array =

Implant in a blood vessel of the brain

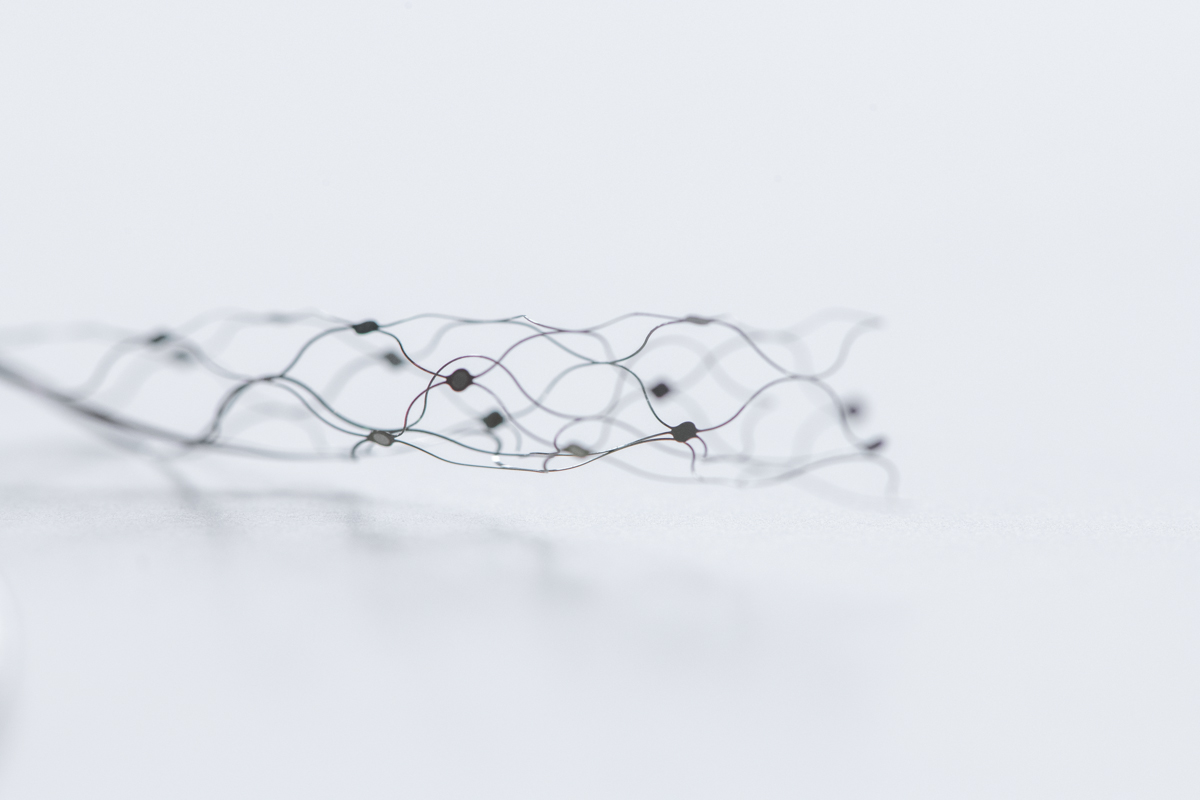
The Stentrode device

Stentrode (Stent-electrode recording array) is a small stent-mounted electrode array permanently implanted into a blood vessel in the brain, without the need for open brain surgery. It is in clinical trials as a brain–computer interface (BCI) for people with paralyzed or missing limbs, who will use their neural signals or thoughts to control external devices, which currently include computer operating systems. The device may ultimately be used to control powered exoskeletons, robotic prosthesis, computers or other devices.

The device was conceived by Australian neurologist Thomas Oxley and built by Australian biomedical engineer Nicholas Opie, who have been developing the medical implant since 2010, using sheep for testing. Human trials started in August 2019 with participants who suffer from amyotrophic lateral sclerosis, a type of motor neuron disease. Graeme Felstead was the first person to receive the implant. To date, eight patients have been implanted and are able to wirelessly control an operating system to text, email, shop and bank using direct thought through the Stentrode brain computer interface, marking the first time a brain-computer interface was implanted via the patient's blood vessels, eliminating the need for open brain surgery.

The FDA granted breakthrough designation to the device in August 2020. In January 2023, researchers demonstrated that it can record brain activity from a nearby blood vessel and be used to operate a computer with no serious adverse events during the first year in all four patients.

== Overview ==
Opie began designing the implant in 2010, through Synchron, a company he founded with Oxley and cardiologist Rahul Sharma. The small implant is an electrode array made of platinum electrodes embedded within a nitinol endovascular stent. The device measures about 5 cm long and a maximum of 8 mm in diameter. The implant is capable of two-way communication, meaning it can both sense thoughts and stimulate movement, essentially acting as a feedback loop within the brain, which offers potential applications for helping people with spinal cord injuries and control robotic prosthetic limbs with their thoughts.

The Stentrode device, developed by Opie and a team at the Vascular Bionics Laboratory within the Department of Medicine at the University of Melbourne, is implanted via the jugular vein into a blood vessel next to cortical tissue near to the motor cortex and sensory cortex, so open brain surgery is avoided. Insertion via the blood vessel avoids direct penetration and damage of the brain tissue. As for blood clotting concerns, Oxley says neurologists routinely use permanent stents in patients' brains to keep blood vessels open. Once in place, it expands to press the electrodes against the vessel wall close to the brain where it can record neural information and deliver currents directly to targeted areas. The signals are captured and sent to a wireless antenna unit implanted in the chest, which sends them to an external receiver. The patient would need to learn how to control a computer operating system that interacts with assistive technologies.

The Stentrode technology has been tested on sheep and humans, with human trials being approved by the St Vincent's Hospital, Melbourne Human Research Ethics Committee, Australia in November 2018. Oxley originally expressed that he expected human clinical trials to help paralyzed people regain movement to operate a motorized wheelchair or even a powered exoskeleton. However, he switched focus before beginning clinical trials. Opie and colleagues began evaluating the Stentrode for its ability to restore functional independence in patients with paralysis, by enabling them to engage in activities of daily living. Clinical study results demonstrated the capability of two ALS patients, surgically fitted with a Stentrode, to learn to control texting and typing, through direct thought and the assistance of eye-tracking technology for cursor navigation. They achieved this with at least 92% accuracy within 3 months of use, and continued to maintain that ability up to 9 months (as of November 2020). This study helped to dispel some criticism that data rates may not be as high as systems requiring open brain surgery, and also pointed out the benefits of using well-established neuro-interventional techniques which do not require any automated assistance, dedicated surgical space or expensive machinery.

Selected patients are people with paralyzed or missing limbs, including people who have suffered strokes, spinal cord injuries, ALS, muscular dystrophy, and amputations.

== See also ==
- Cortical implant
- Neurorobotics
