= Neuroimmunology =

Study of relationships between nervous and immune systems

Neuroimmunology is a field combining neuroscience, the study of the nervous system, and immunology, the study of the immune system. Neuroimmunologists seek to better understand the interactions of these two complex systems during development, homeostasis, and response to injuries. A long-term goal of this rapidly developing research area is to further develop our understanding of the pathology of certain neurological diseases, some of which have no clear etiology. In doing so, neuroimmunology contributes to development of new pharmacological treatments for several neurological conditions. Many types of interactions involve both the nervous and immune systems including the physiological functioning of the two systems in health and disease, malfunction of either and or both systems that leads to disorders, and the physical, chemical, and environmental stressors that affect the two systems on a daily basis.

== Background ==
Neural targets that control thermogenesis, behavior, sleep, and mood can be affected by pro-inflammatory cytokines which are released by activated macrophages and monocytes during infection. Within the central nervous system production of cytokines has been detected as a result of brain injury, during viral and bacterial infections, and in neurodegenerative processes.

From the US National Institute of Health:

"Despite the brain's status as an immune privileged site, an extensive bi-directional communication takes place between the nervous and the immune system in both health and disease. Immune cells and neuroimmune molecules such as cytokines, chemokines, and growth factors modulate brain function through multiple signaling pathways throughout the lifespan. Immunological, physiological and psychological stressors engage cytokines and other immune molecules as mediators of interactions with neuroendocrine, neuropeptide, and neurotransmitter systems. For example, brain cytokine levels increase following stress exposure, while treatments designed to alleviate stress reverse this effect.

"Neuroinflammation and neuroimmune activation have been shown to play a role in the etiology of a variety of neurological disorders such as stroke, Parkinson's and Alzheimer's disease, multiple sclerosis, pain, and AIDS-associated dementia. However, cytokines and chemokines also modulate CNS function in the absence of overt immunological, physiological, or psychological challenges. For example, cytokines and cytokine receptor inhibitors affect cognitive and emotional processes. Recent evidence suggests that immune molecules modulate brain systems differently across the lifespan. Cytokines and chemokines regulate neurotrophins and other molecules critical to neurodevelopmental processes, and exposure to certain neuroimmune challenges early in life affects brain development. In adults, cytokines and chemokines affect synaptic plasticity and other ongoing neural processes, which may change in aging brains. Finally, interactions of immune molecules with the hypothalamic-pituitary-gonadal system indicate that sex differences are a significant factor determining the impact of neuroimmune influences on brain function and behavior."

Recent research demonstrates that reduction of lymphocyte populations can impair cognition in mice, and that restoration of lymphocytes restores cognitive abilities.

== Epigenetics ==
=== Overview ===
Epigenetic medicine encompasses a new branch of neuroimmunology that studies the brain and behavior, and has provided insights into the mechanisms underlying brain development, evolution, neuronal and network plasticity and homeostasis, senescence, the etiology of diverse neurological diseases and neural regenerative processes. It is leading to the discovery of environmental stressors that dictate initiation of specific neurological disorders and specific disease biomarkers. The goal is to "promote accelerated recovery of impaired and seemingly irrevocably lost cognitive, behavioral, sensorimotor functions through epigenetic reprogramming of endogenous regional neural stem cells".

=== Neural stem cell fate ===
Several studies have shown that regulation of stem cell maintenance and the subsequent fate determinations are quite complex. The complexity of determining the fate of a stem cell can be best understood by knowing the "circuitry employed to orchestrate stem cell maintenance and progressive neural fate decisions". Neural fate decisions include the utilization of multiple neurotransmitter signal pathways along with the use of epigenetic regulators. The advancement of neuronal stem cell differentiation and glial fate decisions must be orchestrated timely to determine subtype specification and subsequent maturation processes including myelination.

=== Neurodevelopmental disorders ===
Neurodevelopmental disorders result from impairments of growth and development of the brain and nervous system and lead to many disorders. Examples of these disorders include Asperger syndrome, traumatic brain injury, communication, speech and language disorders, genetic disorders such as fragile-X syndrome, Down syndrome, ADHD, epilepsy, and fetal alcohol syndrome. Studies have shown that autism spectrum disorders (ASDs) may present due to basic disorders of epigenetic regulation. Other neuroimmunological research has shown that deregulation of correlated epigenetic processes in ASDs can alter gene expression and brain function without causing classical genetic lesions which are more easily attributable to a cause and effect relationship. These findings are some of the numerous recent discoveries in previously unknown areas of gene misexpression.

=== Neurodegenerative disorders ===
Increasing evidence suggests that neurodegenerative diseases are mediated by erroneous epigenetic mechanisms. Neurodegenerative diseases include Huntington's disease and Alzheimer's disease. Neuroimmunological research into these diseases has yielded evidence including the absence of simple Mendelian inheritance patterns, global transcriptional dysregulation, multiple types of pathogenic RNA alterations, and many more. In one of the experiments, a treatment of Huntington's disease with histone deacetylases (HDAC), an enzyme that removes acetyl groups from lysine, and DNA/RNA binding anthracylines that affect nucleosome positioning, showed positive effects on behavioral measures, neuroprotection, nucleosome remodeling, and associated chromatin dynamics. Another new finding on neurodegenerative diseases involves the overexpression of HDAC6 suppresses the neurodegenerative phenotype associated with Alzheimer's disease pathology in associated animal models. Other findings show that additional mechanisms are responsible for the "underlying transcriptional and post-transcriptional dysregulation and complex chromatin abnormalities in Huntington's disease".

=== Neuroimmunological disorders ===
The nervous and immune systems have many interactions that dictate overall body health. The nervous system is under constant monitoring from both the adaptive and innate immune system. Throughout development and adult life, the immune system detects and responds to changes in cell identity and neural connectivity. Deregulation of both adaptive and acquired immune responses, impairment of crosstalk between these two systems, as well as alterations in the deployment of innate immune mechanisms can predispose the central nervous system (CNS) to autoimmunity and neurodegeneration. Other evidence has shown that development and deployment of the innate and acquired immune systems in response to stressors on functional integrity of cellular and systemic level and the evolution of autoimmunity are mediated by epigenetic mechanisms. Autoimmunity has been increasingly linked to targeted deregulation of epigenetic mechanisms, and therefore, use of epigenetic therapeutic agents may help reverse complex pathogenic processes. Multiple sclerosis (MS) is one type of neuroimmunological disorder that affects many people. MS features CNS inflammation, immune-mediated demyelination and neurodegeneration.

Myalgic Encephalomyelitis (also known as Chronic fatigue syndrome), is a multi-system disease that causes dysfunction of neurological, immune, endocrine and energy-metabolism systems. Though many patients show neuroimmunological degeneration, the correct roots of ME/CFS are unknown. Symptoms of ME/CFS include significantly lowered ability to participate in regular activities, stand or sit straight, inability to talk, sleep problems, excessive sensitivity to light, sound or touch and/or thinking and memory problems (defective cognitive functioning). Other common symptoms are muscle or joint pain, sore throat or night sweats. There is no treatment but symptoms may be treated. Patients that are sensitive to mold may show improvement in symptoms having moved to drier areas. Some patients in general have less severe ME, whereas others may be bedridden for life.

PTSD has been linked to neuroimmunity dysfunction with this being greater in individuals with worse anhedonia.

== Major themes of research ==
The interaction of the CNS and immune system are fairly well known. Burn-induced organ dysfunction using vagus nerve stimulation has been found to attenuate organ and serum cytokine levels. Burns generally induce abacterial cytokine generation and perhaps parasympathetic stimulation after burns would decrease cardiodepressive mediator generation. Multiple groups have produced experimental evidence that support proinflammatory cytokine production being the central element of the burn-induced stress response. Still other groups have shown that vagus nerve signaling has a prominent impact on various inflammatory pathologies. These studies have laid the groundwork for inquiries that vagus nerve stimulation may influence postburn immunological responses and thus can ultimately be used to limit organ damage and failure from burn induced stress.

Basic understanding of neuroimmunological diseases has changed significantly during the last ten years. New data broadening the understanding of new treatment concepts has been obtained for a large number of neuroimmunological diseases, none more so than multiple sclerosis, since many efforts have been undertaken recently to clarify the complexity of pathomechanisms of this disease. Accumulating evidence from animal studies suggests that some aspects of depression and fatigue in MS may be linked to inflammatory markers. Studies have demonstrated that Toll like-receptor (TLR4) is critically involved in neuroinflammation and T cell recruitment in the brain, contributing to exacerbation of brain injury. Research into the link between smell, depressive behavior, and autoimmunity has turned up interesting findings including the facts that inflammation is common in all of the diseases analyzed, depressive symptoms appear early in the course of most diseases, smell impairment is also apparent early in the development of neurological conditions, and all of the diseases involved the amygdale and hippocampus. Better understanding of how the immune system functions and what factors contribute to responses are being heavily investigated along with the aforementioned coincidences.

Neuroimmunology is also an important topic to consider during the design of neural implants. Neural implants are being used to treat many diseases, and it is key that their design and surface chemistry do not elicit an immune response.

== Future directions ==
The nervous system and immune system require the appropriate degrees of cellular differentiation, organizational integrity, and neural network connectivity. These operational features of the brain and nervous system may make signaling difficult to duplicate in severely diseased scenarios. There are currently three classes of therapies that have been utilized in both animal models of disease and in human clinical trials. These three classes include DNA methylation inhibitors, HDAC inhibitors, and RNA-based approaches. DNA methylation inhibitors are used to activate previously silenced genes. HDACs are a class of enzymes that have a broad set of biochemical modifications and can affect DNA demethylation and synergy with other therapeutic agents. The final therapy includes using RNA-based approaches to enhance stability, specificity, and efficacy, especially in diseases that are caused by RNA alterations. Emerging concepts concerning the complexity and versatility of the epigenome may suggest ways to target genomewide cellular processes. Other studies suggest that eventual seminal regulator targets may be identified allowing with alterations to the massive epigenetic reprogramming during gametogenesis. Many future treatments may extend beyond being purely therapeutic and may be preventable perhaps in the form of a vaccine. Newer high throughput technologies when combined with advances in imaging modalities such as in vivo optical nanotechnologies may give rise to even greater knowledge of genomic architecture, nuclear organization, and the interplay between the immune and nervous systems.

The progress in studying natural processes that appear during pregnancy also can help to understand the interactions of the nervous and immune systems during development. The theory of Natural Neurostimulation, established by Latvian scientists in 2024, claims that natural forces of the mother's heart electromagnetic field synchronize the two nervous systems (the mother and fetus), promoting proper development and influencing the evolution of the child's biological sentience and cognition. Their experiments provided evidence of the therapeutic effect of this natural neurostimulation: the complex impact on the injured nervous system of electromagnetic fields and acoustic waves, along with cognitive load, scaled based on the parameters of the physical interaction between mother and fetus. Further research would provide evidence that the scaled parameters of this natural stimulation on adult patients, in a case of systematic use, can adjust the injured immune system by providing positive neuroplasticity, balancing the patient's nervous system.

== See also ==
- Immune system
- Neuroimmune system
- Immunology
- Gut–brain axis
- Neural top down control of physiology
- Neurology
- Psychosomatic illness
