= Cellulose electrode =

A cellulose electrode is a welding electrode that has a coating containing organic materials. About 30% of the coating weight is cellulose. In some countries, paper pulp and wood powder are added to the coating in certain ratios to reduce the amount of pure cellulose.

The organic compounds in the coating decompose in the arc to form carbon monoxide, carbon dioxide and hydrogen, which increase the arc tension and thus, the welding arc becomes stronger and harder. Compared with other types of electrodes, with the same current values, a 70% deeper penetration can be obtained with cellulose electrodes.

This type of electrode is generally produced with thin or medium coating thicknesses. When the coating is thin, a light amount of slag is formed on the welding bead and the spatter loss is high. On the other hand, the gap filling and vertical down welding capability as well as penetration of the weld obtained by this electrode is good.

Since this electrode can be used in every position (particularly in vertical down), it has a wide range of applications in the ship building industry and in the welding of pipelines with a wall thickness of less than 12.5 mm. The cellulose that burns during welding forms a very good protective gaseous atmosphere.

== Application ==
The main features of cellulose electrodes are as follows:

- Deep penetrating welding in every position
- Vertical down welding capability
- Weld metal with good mechanical properties
- A less amount of weld pool is developed

The titanium compounds in the coating provide arc stability as well as help clean the slag easily. Adding a certain amount of ferromanganese to the coating makes it possible to compensate for the manganese that is lost through oxidation during welding and to deoxidize the weld pool. Since these electrodes are generally manufactured using a sodium silicate binder, they can best be used with DC(+) polarity.
