= Conductive agent =

Conductive agents are used to ensure electrodes have good charge and discharge performance. Usually, a certain amount of conductive material is added during the production of the pole piece, and the micro current is collected between the active material and the current collector to reduce the micro current. The contact resistance of the electrode accelerates the rate of movement of electrons, and at the same time, can effectively increase the migration rate of lithium ions in the electrode material, thereby improving the charge and discharge efficiency of the electrode. The conductive agent carbon black is used for improving the conductivity of the electrodes and decreasing the resistance of interaction.

== Carbon black conductive agent ==
The conductive carbon black is characterized by small particle size, particularly large specific surface area, and particularly good electrical conductivity, and it can function as a liquid absorption and liquid retention in the battery.

The carbon black conductive agents: acetylene black, 350G, carbon fiber (VGCF), carbon nanotubes (CNTs), Ketjen black (Ketjenblack EC300J, Ketjenblack EC600JD, Carbon ECP, Carbon ECP600JD).

Acetylene Black (Polyacetylene): carbon black obtained by continuous pyrolysis of acetylene having a purity of 99% or more obtained by decomposing and purifying by-product gas during pyrolysis of calcium carbide method or naphtha (crude gasoline).

Ketjen Black: High-efficiency superconducting carbon black for lithium batteries, branched, high purity, and excellent electrical conductivity.

Graphite conductive agent: KS-6, KS-15, SFG-6, SFG-15, etc.

CNTs: the incorporation of CNTs as a conductive additive at a lower weight loading than conventional carbons, like carbon black and graphite, presents a more effective strategy to establish an electrical percolation network.
