= Reversible charge injection limit =

For an electrode in a solution with a particular size and geometry, the reversible charge injection limit is the amount of charge that can move from the electrode to the surroundings without causing a chemical reaction that is irreversible.
