= Thomas Oxley (neurologist) =

Neurointerventionist

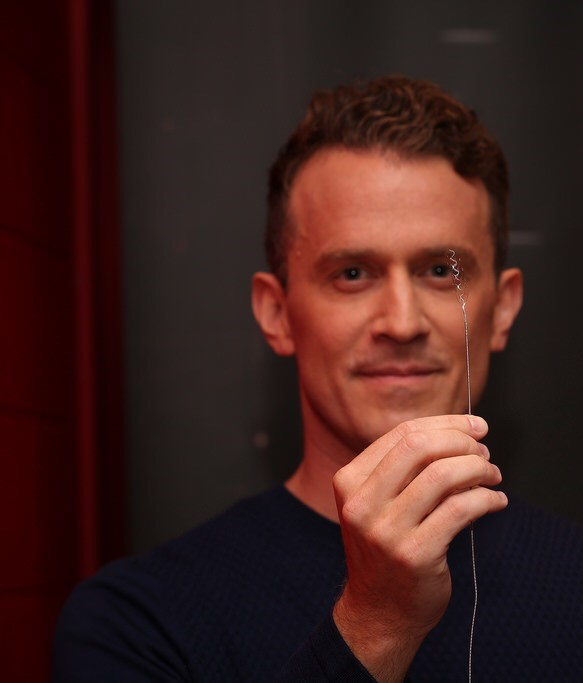
- Dr. Thomas Oxley
- Born: Canberra, Australia
- Education: Monash University, MD; University of Melbourne, PhD Neural Engineering
- Years active: 2012-Present
- Known for: Interventional Neurologist; Neurotechnologist; CEO, Synchron, Inc.
- Medical career
- Profession: Neurointerventionalist, CEO
- Field: Neurology
- Institutions: Synchron, Inc., University of Melbourne
- Website: synchron.com

Thomas J. Oxley is an Australian physician, neuroscientist, and technology entrepreneur. He is the founder and CEO of Synchron, a brain-computer interface (BCI) company headquartered in New York City. Synchron is a neurotechnology company that develops the Stentrode, an endovascular brain-computer interface (BCI) designed to assist people with paralysis by enabling digital communication. The device is implanted via blood vessels, avoiding open-brain surgery, and has been integrated with consumer devices such as the iPhone, iPad, and Apple Vision Pro.

== Work in brain-computer interface ==
While Oxley has been conducting research in motor systems since 2003, he is said to have conceived the idea for the Stentrode™ in 2007 and he led the original team at the University of Melbourne that created the technology. Stentrode is the first motor neuroprosthesis, a form of brain-computer interface implanted via the patient's blood vessels. Oxley's team in Australia was the only non-US-based group funded by DARPA as part of the Reliable Neural-Interface Technology (RE-NET) program and led by Professor Jack Judy.

Dr. Oxley announced in a 2018 TEDxSydney Talk that the company, Synchron, would initiate clinical trials of the Stentrode device with the goal of assisting paralyzed patients to regain independence.

Just two years later, Oxley and Synchron published a first-in-human study on the device in the Journal of NeuroInterventional Surgery. The study showed the ability of two Australians with ALS to email, text, shop, and bank online using the Stentrode Device, and was conducted at Royal Melbourne Hospital. Earlier in 2020, the company had announced that it received Breakthrough Device status from the US Food and Drug Administration (FDA) for the Stentrode.

Oxley's work has been published in major journals including Nature Biotechnology and New England Journal of Medicine, and he is the founder of three start-up companies: SmartStent (which was acquired by Synchron, Inc.), VascuLab and Synchron.

== COVID-19 research ==
Oxley and his colleagues at Mount Sinai reported an increased incidence of stroke identified in patients under 50 years of age with COVID-19, which was published in The New England Journal of Medicine in April 2020.

== Education ==
After earning bachelor's degrees in medical science, medicine and surgery from the University of Monash, Oxley earned doctorate degrees in philosophy and neuroscience from the University of Melbourne. His training included advanced MRI imaging analysis, hardware device (stent) development, and electrophysiological signal processing. Oxley completed residencies in both internal medicine and neurology, as well as a stroke fellowship. From 2015 – 2017, Oxley completed an endovascular neurosurgery fellowship at Mount Sinai Hospital in New York under Professor J. Mocco and Professor Alejandro Berenstein.

== Scientific career ==
Dr Oxley has published 100 internationally peer reviewed articles that have accumulated over 6500 citations, with 13 as first or last author and with an H Index of 20.

== Honours and awards ==
In 2018, Oxley won the 2018 Global Australian Advance Award Winner, an award given to celebrate international Australians who exhibit remarkable talent, exceptional vision and ambition, the UNESCO Netexplo award for Innovation, and was a finalist for the Congress of Neurological Surgeons Innovator of the Year Award.

- 2023 European Patent Office’s European Inventor Award Finalist
- 2023 Fierce 50
- 2022 Bloomberg 50: The People Who Changed Global Business
- 2022 TED Conferences – 2022 Editor’s Pick
- 2021 TIME Magazine Best Inventions of 2021
- 2021 Fast Company World Changing Idea 2021
- 2020 Australian of the Year Award Finalist
- 2018 GQ Australia Innovator of the Year finalist
- 2018 Advance Global Overall Australian of the Year Award
- 2018 Advance Global Australia Award for Life Sciences
- 2018 Congress of Neurological Surgeons (USA), 2018 Innovator of the Year
- 2018 UNESCO Netexplo award for Innovation, Paris, France
- 2017 Chancellor's Prize for Excellence in a PhD Thesis, University of Melbourne
- 2017 Dean's Award for Excellence in a PhD Thesis, University of Melbourne
- 2017 International INDEX Design Awards Finalist, Stentrode, Copenhagen, Denmark
- 2017 Graham Brown Best Publication Award, University of Melbourne
- 2016 Premier's Award (Victoria) for Health and Medical Research (PhD) commendation
- 2016 International Brain Computer Interface Award Finalist
- 2016 SMART 100 companies
- 2016 Nomination for University of Melbourne Chancellor's PhD Award
- 2013 Warren Haynes Fellowship in Neurology
- 2013 NHMRC Postgraduate Scholarship
- 2013 Winner, MTGT Entrepreneurial Accelerator
