= Paul Hunter Peckham =

American academic

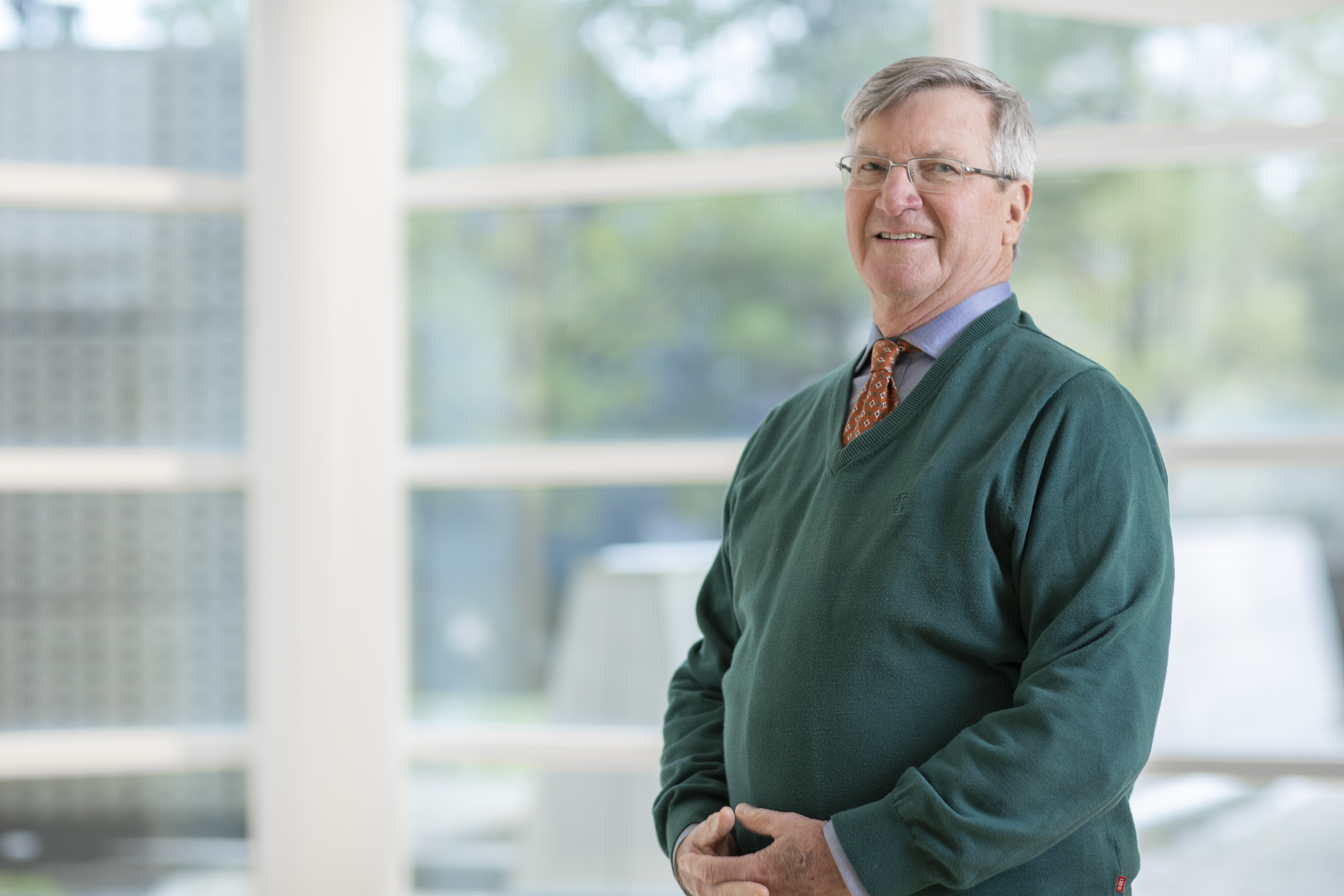
- Education: Case Western Reserve University
- Known for: Development of Neural Prosthetics
- Awards: Paul B. Magnuson Award (2001) American Spinal Injury Association's Lifetime Achievement Award (2015)

Paul Hunter Peckham is an American biomedical engineer. He is professor of biomedical engineering and orthopedics at the Case Western Reserve University, and holds eight patents related to neural prosthetics. Peckham's research involves developing prostheses to restore function in the upper extremities for paralyzed individuals with spinal cord injury.

== Early life and education ==
Peckham is the oldest son in his family, where his father was a package salesman based in Elmira, New York. He completed a Bachelor of Science degree in mechanical engineering at the Clarkson College of Technology. He later pursued a Master of Science degree, and a doctorate in biomedical engineering at Case Western Reserve University. Peckham was based in a research lab based at the Highland View Hospital, where he was carrying out research in the field of spinal cord injury.

== Research career ==
Peckham joined the Case Western Reserve University as a member of the faculty in 1972, and is currently a Donnell professor of Biomedical Engineering and Orthopaedics, where his research involves using functional electrical stimulation to restore function to upper extremities, including hands and arms, in paralyzed individuals with spinal cord injuries.

In 1977, Peckham met Jim Jatich, who had been left without movement in his fingers and a wrist as a result of a diving accident. In collaboration with 25 doctors and researchers, Peckham co-developed multiple iterations of neural prostheses over nine years, which could be implanted, and relied on electrical stimulation to control neuromuscular activation. This neural prosthetic, called Freehand, was further tested with Jatich, who was able to type using an electric typewriter six months after implantation. Peckham later founded NeuroControl Corp. in the 1990s, raising $30 million in funding and receiving two Food & Drug Administration approvals for functional electrical stimulation products for spinal cord patients (including selling Freehand to the public), before the company failed due to insufficient sales.

Peckham holds the position of Distinguished University Professor at Case Western University. He has published over 200 academic papers, with over 15,000 citations, resulting in an h-index and i10-index of 60 and 132 respectively. He is cited as an inventor on eight patents related to neural prosthesis by the United States Patent and Trademark Office.

=== Service ===
Throughout the course of his academic career, Peckham has held various administrative roles, including serving as co-director of the MetroHealth Rehabilitation Institute (within the MetroHealth System), the director of the Functional Electrical Stimulation Center, and founding the non-profit Institute for Functional Restoration at Case Western Reserve University. He has served on the scientific advisory board for the IEEE's Transactions on Biomedical Engineering academic journal. In 2004, Peckham spoke about "Paralysis: Natural recovery versus assistive technology?" at the White House/Veteran Affairs Conference dedicated to Emerging Technologies in Support of the New Freedom Initiative: Promoting Opportunities for People with Disabilities.

=== Awards ===
Peckham has received many awards, including a Paul B. Magnuson Award (2001) from the United States Department of Veterans Affairs, a Lifetime Achievement Award (2015) from the American Spinal Injury Association, a 2020 Lifetime Achievement Award from the North American Neuromodulation Society (NANS), an Annual BCI Research Award (2018), the Frank and Dorothy Humel Hovorka Prize from Case Western Reserve University and was designated as the Pioneer of the Neuroprothesis by the State of Ohio. Peckham was elected as a fellow to the National Academy of Engineering (2002), the American Institute of Medical and Biological Engineering, and the American Spinal Injury Association. He was recognized as an Engineer Of The Year in 2000 by DesignNews.

== Personal life ==
Peckham has a wife named Sara and two children named Endia(Indy) and Gregory(Greg). Peckham also has three grandchildren named Hayden, Eloise and Beatrice (Bea).

== Patents ==
- Kilgore, Kevin L., et al. "Implantable networked neural system." U.S. Patent No. 7,260,436. 21 Aug. 2007.
- Peckham, Paul Hunter, et al. "Functional neuromusclar stimulation system." U.S. Patent No. 5,769,875. 23 Jun. 1998.
- Peckham, Paul Hunter, et al. "Functional neuromuscular stimulation system." U.S. Patent No. 5,776,171. 7 Jul. 1998.
- Peckham, Paul Hunter, et al. "Functional neuromuscular stimulation system." U.S. Patent No. 5,954,758. 21 Sep. 1999.
- Peckham, Paul Hunter, et al. "Functional neuromuscular stimulation system with shielded percutaneous interface." U.S. Patent No. 6,026,328. 15 Feb. 2000.
- Peckham, Paul Hunter, et al. "Functional neuromuscular stimulation system." U.S. Patent No. 6,163,725. 19 Dec. 2000.
- Peckham, Paul Hunter, et al. "Functional neuromuscular stimulation system." U.S. Patent No. 6,718,210. 6 Apr. 2004.
- Kilgore, Kevin L., et al. "Neural prosthesis." U.S. Patent No. 8,532,786. 10 Sep. 2013.

== Selected bibliography ==
- Ajiboye, A.B., Willett, F.R., Young, D.R., Memberg, W.D., Murphy, B.A., Miller, J.P., Walter, B.L., Sweet, J.A., Hoyen, H.A., Keith, M.W. and Peckham, P.H., 2017. Restoration of reaching and grasping in a person with tetraplegia through brain-controlled muscle stimulation: a proof-of-concept demonstration. Lancet (London, England), 389(10081), p. 1821.
- Menezes, I.S., Cohen, L.G., Mello, E.A., Machado, A.G., Peckham, P.H., Anjos, S.M., Siqueira, I.L., Conti, J., Plow, E.B. and Conforto, A.B., 2018. Combined brain and peripheral nerve stimulation in chronic stroke patients with moderate to severe motor impairment. Neuromodulation: Technology at the Neural Interface, 21(2), pp. 176–183.
- Wolpaw, J.R., Birbaumer, N., Heetderks, W.J., McFarland, D.J., Peckham, P.H., Schalk, G., Donchin, E., Quatrano, L.A., Robinson, C.J. and Vaughan, T.M., 2000. Brain-computer interface technology: a review of the first international meeting. IEEE transactions on rehabilitation engineering, 8(2), pp. 164–173.
- Peckham, P.H. and Knutson, J.S., 2005. Functional electrical stimulation for neuromuscular applications. Annu. Rev. Biomed. Eng., 7, pp. 327–360.
- Peckham, P.H., Keith, M.W., Kilgore, K.L., Grill, J.H., Wuolle, K.S., Thrope, G.B., Gorman, P., Hobby, J., Mulcahey, M.J., Carroll, S. and Hentz, V.R., 2001. Efficacy of an implanted neuroprosthesis for restoring hand grasp in tetraplegia: a multicenter study. Archives of physical medicine and rehabilitation, 82(10), pp. 1380–1388.
- Smith, B., Peckham, P.H., Keith, M.W. and Roscoe, D.D., 1987. An externally powered, multichannel, implantable stimulator for versatile control of paralyzed muscle. IEEE Transactions on Biomedical Engineering, (7), pp. 499–508.
- Keith, M.W., Peckham, P.H., Thrope, G.B., Stroh, K.C., Smith, B., Buckett, J.R., Kilgore, K.L. and Jatich, J.W., 1989. Implantable functional neuromuscular stimulation in the tetraplegic hand. Journal of Hand Surgery, 14(3), pp. 524–530.
