= Konstantin Slavin =

American neurosurgeon and academic

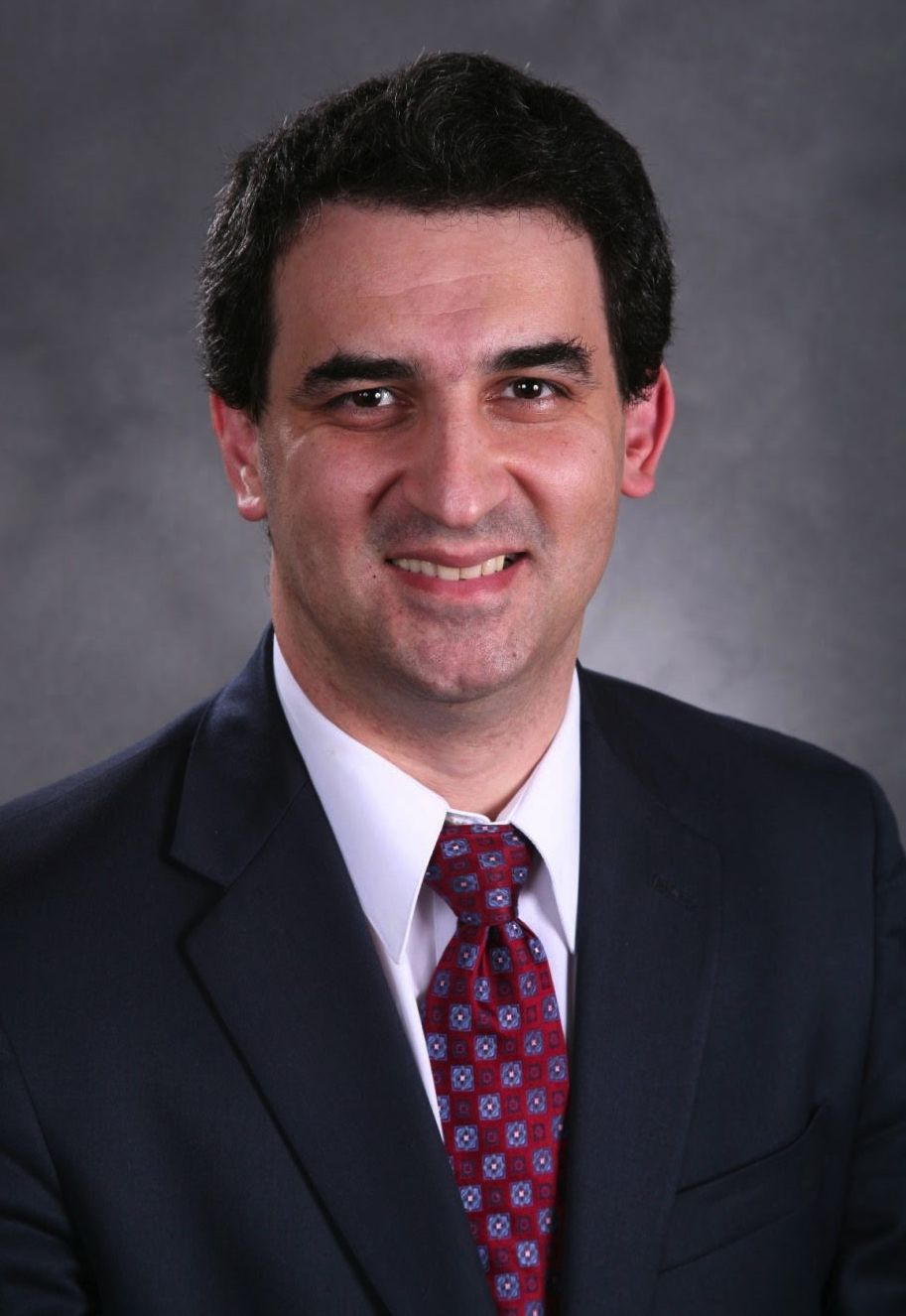
- Education: Azerbaijan Medical University; University of Illinois Hospital & Health Sciences System
- Awards: Won Patients Choice Award in (2010)
- Scientific career
- Workplaces: University of Illinois College of Medicine
- Website: hospital.uillinois.edu/find-a-doctor/konstantin-slavin; chicago.medicine.uic.edu/departments/academic-departments/neurosurgery/faculty-and-staff/name/konstantin-slavin/

Konstantin Slavin is a Professor and Head of the Department of Stereotactic and functional neurosurgery at the University of Illinois College of Medicine. He is a former president of the American Society for Stereotactic and functional neurosurgery and current vice-president of the World Society for Stereotactic and Functional Neurosurgery. His specialties include Aneurysm, Brain surgery, Brain Tumor, Cerebrovascular Disorders, Craniotomy, Dystonia, Essential Tremor, Facial Nerve Pain, Facial Pain, Glioblastoma, Headache disorders, Laminectomy, Lower back pain, Movement Disorders, Multiple Sclerosis, Neck Pain, Neurosurgery, Neurosurgical Procedures, Pain, Parkinson Disease, Spinal Cord Injuries, and Stroke.

== Education ==
Prof. Konstantin Slavin earned his medical degree from the Azerbaijan state medical institute in 1988 when he was 18 years old. He completed neurosurgery residency in Russian Post-Graduate Medical Academy and then did both his internship and residency at the University of Illinois Medical Center at Chicago and completed a fellowship program at the Oregon Health Sciences University School of Medicine.

== Research and career ==
Prof. Konstantin Slavin's research interests include psychiatric disorders, movement disorders, stereotactic radiosurgery, and occipital nerve stimulation. He did research on tonic and burst spinal cord stimulation for the treatment of chronic pain and also conducted research on the deep brain stimulation of the subthalamic nucleus in patients with Parkinson's Disease. His clinical interests include stereotactic and functional neurosurgery, facial pain, trigeminal neuralgia, and gamma knife Stereotactic radiosurgery.

Dr. Konstantin Slavin is a professor of neurosurgery and head of the stereotactic and functional neurosurgery section at UIC and also serving as the secretary of the International Neuromodulation Society. He is the clinical advisor as well as a member of the clinical group at the Institute of Neuromodulation Committee and also lends his services as the Fellowship Program Director in the department of stereotactic and functional neurosurgery at UIC.

== Awards and honors ==
Dr. Konstantin Slavin received the patient's Choice Award in the year 2010. Additional awards include the Most Compassionate Doctor, Top Surgeons, and Best Doctors in the United States of America.

He is now an advisory board member of the Facial Pain Association Vycor Medical, Inc and Stimwave, Inc. and an editorial board member for the journals Neurosurgery, Neuromodulation and Brain Sciences.

== Publications ==
- Konstantin V. Slavin, Hrachya Nersesyan, and Christian Wess. "Peripheral Neurostimulation for Treatment of Intractable Occipital Neuralgia". Journal of Neurosurgery.
- Konstantin V. Slavin, M. Efkan Colpan, Naureen Munawar, Christian Wess, and Hrachya Nersesyan. "Trigeminal and occipital peripheral nerve stimulation for craniofacial pain: a single-institution experience and review of the literature". Journal of Neurosurgery.
- Konstantin V. Slavin. "Peripheral nerve stimulation for neuropathic pain". Journal of Neurotherapeutics.
- Konstantin V. Slavin, and Christian Wess. "Trigeminal Branch Stimulation for Intractable Neuropathic Pain: Technical Note". Wiley Online Library.
- Konstantin V. Slavin, Manuel Dujovny, James I. Ausman, Gerardo Hernandez A, Mark Luer Phar, and Hugh Stoddart. "Clinical experience with transcranial cerebral oximetry". Journal of Surgical Neurology.
- Peripheral Nerve Stimulation (2011)
- Neurostimulation: Principles and Practice (2013)
- Stimulation of the Peripheral Nervous System: The Neuromodulation Frontier (2015)
