= Anna Woodbury =

American anesthesiologist, pain medicine physician, and clinical researcher

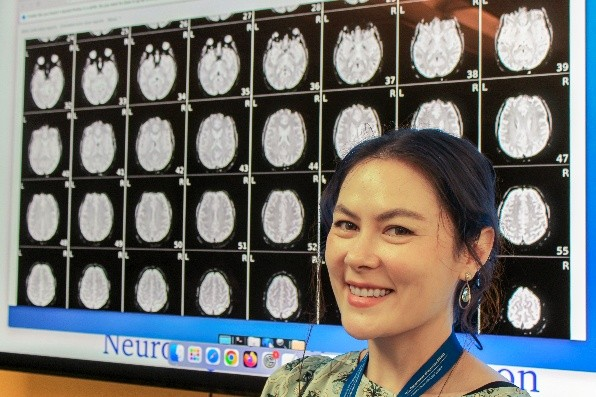
- Education: Rice University (BA) Washington University School of Medicine (MD) Emory University (MS)
- Known for: Research on non-invasive and minimally invasive neuromodulation therapies for fibromyalgia, chronic pain, and related conditions
- Notable work: Pain Medicine Board Review

Anna Woodbury is an American anesthesiologist, pain medicine physician, and clinical researcher at Emory University School of Medicine and the Atlanta Veterans Affairs Health Care System (VAHCS). Her research focuses on non-invasive and minimally invasive neuromodulation therapies including transcutaneous and auricular vagus nerve stimulation, cranial electrotherapy stimulation, percutaneous electrical nerve field stimulation, and repetitive transcranial magnetic stimulation for the treatment of fibromyalgia, chronic pain, and related conditions, with an emphasis on reducing reliance on opioid medications.

== Education and career ==
Woodbury earned a Bachelor of Arts in biochemistry, magna cum laude, from Rice University (2001–2004), and a Doctor of Medicine from Washington University in St. Louis School of Medicine (2004–2008). She completed an internship in internal medicine at the University of Texas Health Science Center San Antonio (2008–2009), followed by residency in anesthesiology (2009–2012), a research fellowship funded by the Foundation for Anesthesia Education and Research (2012–2013) and a fellowship in pain management (2013–2014), at Emory University-affiliated hospitals in Atlanta. She later earned a Master of Science in Clinical Research from Emory University (2017–2020). She is double board-certified in anesthesiology and pain medicine by the American Board of Anesthesiology and is licensed to practice medical acupuncture in Georgia.

In 2014, Woodbury founded and became the first chief of the Division of Pain Medicine in the Anesthesiology Service Line at the Atlanta VA Medical Center, a role she held through 2016. At Emory University School of Medicine, she progressed through the faculty ranks from assistant professor (2014–2020) to associate professor (2020–2026) of anesthesiology, and served as Associate Program Director of the Multidisciplinary Pain Fellowship (2015–2022) and Associate Vice Chair of Research for the Department of Anesthesiology (2022–2024) before being named Vice Chair of Research in September 2024. She has also served on the Board of Directors of the United States Association for the Study of Pain and as chronic pain section editor and an editorial board member for Anesthesia & Analgesia.

== Research ==
Woodbury's research program centers on non-pharmacological neuromodulation for chronic pain, principally fibromyalgia, and on the use of neuroimaging to identify biomarkers of treatment response. Much of her federally funded work has been conducted through the Atlanta VAHCS's Center for Visual and Neurocognitive Rehabilitation and the CReATE MOTION Center, in collaboration with the Department of Veterans Affairs Rehabilitation Research & Development Service, the National Institutes of Health, and the Congressionally Directed Medical Research Programs.

=== Auricular and percutaneous nerve field stimulation for fibromyalgia ===
Woodbury led a series of studies evaluating per-cutaneous electrical nerve field stimulation (PENFS) applied to the ear in veterans with fibromyalgia, using functional MRI (fMRI) to assess treatment-related changes in brain structure and connectivity. An early feasibility protocol, published in JMIR Research Protocols in 2018, described the study design for auricular PENFS in fibromyalgia. The resulting randomized trial, published in Pain Medicine in 2020, reported on the feasibility of auricular field stimulation as assessed by fMRI. Follow-up analyses reported that PENFS was associated with measurable changes in cortical thickness and, in a 2025–2026 randomized trial reported in Anesthesia & Analgesia, with changes in white matter integrity. This white-matter finding was covered by the trade publication Pain Medicine News, which reported that the study was among the first to link the therapy to measurable changes in brain structure in fibromyalgia patients.

=== Vagus nerve stimulation ===
Woodbury has studied trans-cutaneous vagus nerve stimulation as a non-invasive intervention for chronic pain and stress-related conditions. She was a co-investigator on a pilot study of trans-cutaneous cervical vagal nerve stimulation in veterans with post-traumatic stress disorder (PTSD), which reported effects on PTSD symptoms and on interleukin-6 responses to stress. With Peter Staats, she co-edited a 2024 special issue and editorial in Frontiers in Pain Research on non-invasive and minimally invasive vagus nerve stimulation for chronic pain. Her group's work in this area was featured in the Emory–Georgia Public Broadcasting documentary series Your Fantastic Mind, which included a veteran with fibromyalgia describing the impact of Woodbury's care and the research program on his life.

=== Cranial electrotherapy stimulation ===
Woodbury has also studied cranial electrotherapy stimulation (CES) for fibromyalgia. In a 2024 randomized, sham-controlled trial published in the Journal of Visualized Experiments, she and colleagues used brain-imaging biomarkers to evaluate CES for pain and physical function. Findings presented at the 2024 ASRA Pain Medicine annual meeting and reported by Newswise indicated that daily CES sessions were associated with a modest reduction in pain scores and increased functional connectivity between the cerebellum and brain regions involved in visual processing and memory, although the treatment did not significantly outperform sham stimulation on overall pain intensity. The trial and its cerebellar findings were subsequently discussed in an editorial by Woodbury and a colleague on the role of the cerebellum in pain processing.

=== Integrative and complementary approaches to pain ===
Woodbury has written narrative and systematic reviews on complementary and integrative therapies for pain, including a widely cited 2015 review in the Canadian Journal of Anesthesia on complementary and alternative medicine for anesthesiologists and pain practitioners, and later reviews on integrative approaches to cancer pain and to chronic pain management more broadly. She is licensed as a medical acupuncturist and has clinical and research interests in auricular acupuncture, including so-called "battlefield acupuncture" protocols used in veteran populations.

=== Early research: neuroprotection and natural compounds ===
Earlier in her career, Woodbury's laboratory research examined the neuroprotective and anti-inflammatory properties of natural compounds, particularly honokiol, a compound derived from Magnolia bark. Her 2013 review in Frontiers in Neurology summarized the neuro-modulating effects of honokiol, and a 2015 study in the Journal of Natural Products evaluated honokiol for the treatment of neonatal pain and prevention of associated neurobehavioral disorders.

=== Educational materials and clinical guidance ===
With colleagues at Emory, Woodbury authored Pain Medicine Board Review (Elsevier), a question-and-answer study guide for the American Board of Anesthesiology's pain medicine certification examination, first published in 2017 with a second edition in 2021. In a published review of the book, Tariq M. Malik of the University of Chicago Pritzker School of Medicine described it as a companion to Honorio Benzon's Practical Management of Pain that "is quite successful in summarizing the main points of the textbook in a few hundred pages." Woodbury was also a co-author of a 2025 multi-specialty international consensus practice guideline on sacroiliac joint complex pain.

== Public engagement ==
Woodbury's research on fibromyalgia was the subject of a 2025 episode of Your Fantastic Mind, an Emmy Award-winning documentary series produced by Emory University and Georgia Public Broadcasting and broadcast nationally on PBS, in which she and colleagues discussed vagus nerve stimulation research for chronic pain.^{[14]} A 2016 FOX 5 Atlanta report followed Navy veteran Scott Cohen, whom Woodbury diagnosed with complex regional pain syndrome and treated at the Atlanta VA Medical Center with nerve blocks and spinal cord stimulation; the report described his substantial pain relief and discontinuation of narcotic medication after implantation. In April 2025, Woodbury participated in a public workshop convened by the National Academies of Sciences, Engineering, and Medicine, funded by the Social Security Administration, on the treatment and management of chronic pain and its implications for disability determinations; the proceedings were published by the National Academies Press later that year.

== Selected publications ==
=== Books ===
- Woodbury A, Spektor B, Singh V, Bobzien B, Patel T, Kalangara J. Pain Medicine Board Review. 1st ed. Elsevier; 2017.
- Woodbury A, Spektor B, Singh V, Bobzien B, Patel T, Kalangara J. Pain Medicine Board Review. 2nd ed. Elsevier; 2021.

=== Book chapters (selected) ===
- Patterson GT, Ohanu C, Woodbury A. "Technology and Pain Management." In: Future Perspectives in Perioperative Pain Management. Eds. Gulur P, Przkora R. pp. 245–253.
- Dharanendra S, Shoham S, Woodbury A. "The Role of Integrative Medicine and Alternative Therapies." In: Future Perspectives in Perioperative Pain Management. Eds. Gulur P, Przkora R. pp. 255–277.
- Woodbury A, Leung A. "Adjuvant Treatments." In: Fibromyalgia: Clinical Guidelines and Treatments. Eds. Lawson E, Wallace M. Springer; 2015:113–127.
- Woodbury A, Singh V. "Coccygodynia." In: Pain Management Review: A Problem Based Learning Approach. Ed. Anitescu M. Oxford University Press; 2018.
- Ogidan C, Woodbury A. "Complementary and Alternative Therapies for Post-Traumatic Neuropathic Pain." In: Peripheral Nerve Injury and Pain. Ed. Leung A. Nova Science Publishers; 2019:193–228.
- Kitzman J, Woodbury A. "Adjuvant Treatments for CRPS." In: Complex Regional Pain Syndrome. Eds. Lawson E, Castellanos J. Springer; 2021:149–177.
- Bennett S, Smith T, Woodbury A. "Vagus Nerve Stimulation for the Management of Fibromyalgia." In: Vagus Nerve Stimulation. Eds. Staats P, Ayata C, Lerman I, Abd-Elsayed A. 1st ed. Elsevier; 2024:233–244.
- Chadwick A, Martucci K, Young E, Bozer A, Woodbury A. "Brain Imaging and Biomarkers in the Diagnosis and Management of Chronic Pain." In: Essentials of Pain Medicine. 5th ed. Ed. Benzon H. (in press).

=== Journal articles (selected) ===
- Woodbury A, Yu SP, Chen D, Gu X, Lee J, Zhang J, Espinera A, García PS, Wei L. "Honokiol for the Treatment of Neonatal Pain and Prevention of Consequent Neurobehavioral Disorders." Journal of Natural Products. 2015;78(11):2531–2536. PMID 26539813.
- Fraser L, Woodbury A. "Case report: Percutaneous electrical neural field stimulation in two cases of sympathetically-mediated pain." F1000Research. 2017;6:920. PMID 29057068; PMCID: PMC5629543.
- Gebre M, Woodbury A, Napadow V, Krishnamurthy G, Krishnamurthy L, Sniecinski R, Crosson B. "Protocol for Feasibility Study: fMRI Evaluation of Auricular Percutaneous Electric Neural Field Stimulation for Fibromyalgia." JMIR Research Protocols. 2018;7(2):e39. PMID 29410385; PMCID: PMC5820456.
- Woodbury A. "A Longitudinal Approach to Stimulation at the C2-3 Medial Branches Over Lamina to Relieve Occipital Neuralgia: Case Report." Neuromodulation: Technology at the Neural Interface. 2020. PMID 32672841.
- Woodbury A, Krishnamurthy V, Gebre M, Napadow V, Bicknese C, Liu M, Lukemire J, Kalangara J, Cui X, Guo Y, Sniecinski R, Crosson B. "Feasibility of Auricular Field Stimulation in Fibromyalgia: Evaluation by Functional Magnetic Resonance Imaging, Randomized Trial." Pain Medicine. 2020:pnaa317. PMID 33164085.
- Darabad RR, Kalangara JP, Woodbury A. "Case Series: Cancer-Related Facial Pain Treated with Stellate Ganglion Block." Palliative Medicine Reports. 2020;1(1):290–295. PMID 34223488; PMCID: PMC8241335.
- Bremner JD, Wittbrodt M, Gurel N, et al. (incl. Woodbury A). "Transcutaneous Cervical Vagal Nerve Stimulation in Patients with Posttraumatic Stress Disorder (PTSD): A Pilot Study of Effects on PTSD Symptoms and Interleukin-6 Response to Stress." Journal of Affective Disorders Reports. 2021;6:100190. PMID 34778863; PMCID: PMC8580056.
- Meka A, Ji D, Woodbury A. "Evolving Understanding of the Classification of Fibromyalgia Following Surgery." Pain Medicine. 2022;23(2):424–426. PMID 33940634.
- Woodbury A, Krishnamurthy L, Bohsali A, Krishnamurthy V, Smith J, Gebre M, Tyler K, Vernon M, Crosson B, Kalangara J, Napadow V, Allen JW, Harper D. "Percutaneous Electric Nerve Field Stimulation Alters Cortical Thickness in a Pilot Study of Veterans with Fibromyalgia." Neurobiology of Pain. 2022;12:100093. PMID 35733704; PMCID: PMC9207563.
- Ree A, Rapsas B, Denmon C, Vernon M, Rauch SA, Guo Y, Cui X, Stevens JS, Krishnamurthy V, Napadow V, Turner JA, Woodbury A. "A Randomized, Sham-Controlled Trial of Cranial Electrical Stimulation for Fibromyalgia Pain and Physical Function, Using Brain Imaging Biomarkers." Journal of Visualized Experiments. 2024;(203):e65790. PMID 38251752; PMCID: PMC11908385.
- Quidé Y, Jahanshad N, et al. (incl. Woodbury A). "ENIGMA-Chronic Pain: a worldwide initiative to identify brain correlates of chronic pain." Pain. 2024. PMID 39058957.
- Hellman N, Haft SM, Woodbury A, Sherrill AM, Rauch SAM. "The Pain of PTSD: Integrating Persistent or Chronic Pain within Emotional Processing Theory of PTSD." European Journal of Psychotraumatology. 2025.
- Sterling L, Fisher K, Woodbury A. "Stellate Ganglion Block for PTSD and Chronic Low Back Pain: A Case Report of Three Veterans." Journal of Clinical Medicine. 2025;14(10):3375. doi:10.3390/jcm14103375.
- Vernon M, Rapsas B, Krishnamurthy LC, Krishnamurthy V, Stevens J, Woodbury A. "Percutaneous Electrical Nerve Field Stimulation and White Matter Integrity in a Randomized Trial of Veterans With Fibromyalgia." Anesthesia & Analgesia. 2025. doi:10.1213/ANE.0000000000007785. PMID 41134340.
- McCormick ZL, Hurley RW, et al. (incl. Woodbury A), Cohen SP. "Consensus practice guidelines on sacroiliac joint complex pain from a multispecialty, international working group." Regional Anesthesia & Pain Medicine. 2025. doi:10.1136/rapm-2025-107387.
- McCormick ZL, Hurley RW, et al. (incl. Woodbury A), Cohen SP. "Consensus practice guidelines on sacroiliac joint complex pain from a multispecialty, international working group." Pain Medicine. 2025;26(12):817–917. PMID 41318933; PMCID: PMC12681192. (Selected as a "Best of 2025" article by the journal.)
- Rauch SAM, Yasinski C, Mahsa M, Woodbury A, et al. "Reducing Chronic Pain with Transcranial Direct Current Stimulation (tDCS) in Veterans Engaged in Intensive Outpatient Mental Health Treatment: A Pilot Study." Military Medicine. 2026. (In press.)

=== Editorials and reviews (selected) ===
- Woodbury A. "Waste not, want not: upcycling research data from chronic pain trials." PAIN Reports. 2023;8(3):e1070. PMID 37032815; PMCID: PMC10079333.
- Woodbury A, Wei L, Yu SP, Garcia P. "Neuro-modulating effects of honokiol: a review." Frontiers in Neurology. 2013;4:130. PMID 24062717; PMCID: PMC3769637.
- Woodbury A, Soong S, Fishman D, Garcia P. "Complementary and alternative medicine therapies for the anesthesiologist and pain practitioner: a narrative review." Canadian Journal of Anaesthesia. 2015;63(1):69–85. PMID 26467546.
- Woodbury A, McCrary MR, Yu SP. "Molecular Targets and Natural Compounds in Drug Development for the Treatment of Inflammatory Pain." Current Drug Targets. 2018;19(16):1905–1915. PMID 29756577.
- Woodbury A, Myles B. "Integrative Therapies in Cancer Pain." Cancer Treatment and Research. 2021;182:281–302. PMID 34542889.
- Hemani S, Lane O, Agarwal S, Yu SP, Woodbury A. "Systematic Review of Erythropoietin (EPO) for Neuroprotection in Human Studies." Neurochemical Research. 2021;46(4):732–739. PMID 33521906.
- Woodbury A, Staats P. "Editorial: Non-invasive and minimally invasive vagus nerve stimulation for chronic pain." Frontiers in Pain Research. 2024;5:1402918. PMID 38812854; PMCID: PMC11133698.
- Martini RS, Brown T, Singh V, Woodbury A. "Integrative Approaches for Cancer Pain Management." Current Oncology Reports. 2024. PMID 38683254.
- Schmidt M, Woodbury A. "Beyond Balance: The Cerebellum and Pain." Pain Medicine. 2025:pnaf100. PMID 40748732.
- Rayasam S, Woodbury A. "Integrative medicine for chronic pain management: a narrative review." Current Opinion in Anaesthesiology. 2025;38(5):694–701. PMID 40910627.

== Honors and awards (selected) ==
- Gertie Marx Research and Education Award, Foundation for Anesthesia Education and Research (2012)
- Crawford Long Research Award, Department of Anesthesiology, Emory University (2013)
- Albert E. Levy Junior Faculty Award for Scientific Research, Emory University (2019)
- 1st Place Poster, "Peripheral Nerve Stimulation," North American Neuromodulation Society (2020)
- Emory School of Medicine Mentoring Award (2021)
- Best of Meeting Award and President's Choice Abstract, American Society of Regional Anesthesia and Pain Medicine (2024)
- "Best of 2025" article selection, Pain Medicine, for the sacroiliac joint pain consensus guidelines
- Aspen Ideas: Health Fellow (2025)
