= ElectroCore =

Medical technology company in New Jersey

- Type: Public
- Traded as: Nasdaq: ECOR
- Industry: Medical technology
- Founded: 2005
- Founder: JP Errico; Thomas J. Errico; Charles Theofilos; Peter Staats
- Headquarters: Basking Ridge, New Jersey
- Key people: Daniel S. Goldberger (CEO)
- Website: https://www.electrocore.com/

electroCore, Inc. (Nasdaq: ECOR) is a medical technology company based in Basking Ridge, New Jersey. electroCore was co-founded in 2005 by JP Errico, Thomas J. Errico, MD, Charles Theofilos, MD, and Peter Staats, MD. The current chief executive officer is Daniel S. Goldberger. electroCore has one product called gammaCore, a non-invasive, commercially available product that uses vagus nerve stimulation.

== History ==
The company was co-founded by JP Errico, Thomas J. Errico, MD, Charles Theofilos, MD, and Peter Staats, MD, in 2005.

In 2018, electroCore, Inc. went public with a $78 million IPO.

On March 27, 2020, electroCore announced a common stock purchase agreement of up to $25 million with Chicago-based institutional investor Lincoln Park Capital Fund, LLC.

In 2025, the company acquired NeuroMetrix, adding the Quell electrical nerve stimulation platform to its product portfolio.

== Products ==
=== gammaCore Sapphire CV ===
In July 2020, the FDA gave an emergency COVID-19 authorization for gammaCore Sapphire CV, a vagus nerve stimulation device, aimed at reducing exacerbations in people potentially affected by the novel coronavirus and have difficulty breathing due to asthma.

=== Truvaga ===
A VNS product owned by Electrocore.
