= North American Neuromodulation Society =

Professional organization

- President: Julie Pilitsis

North American Neuromodulation Society (NANS) is a professional scientific organization that serves to promote and advance neuromodulation as a treatment for various diseases.

The majority of its members work in pain-related disciplines, although members in areas such as epilepsy, urinary incontinence, angina, and movement disorders are also represented. Medical specialties represented in the membership include anesthesiology, neurosurgery, neurology, physical medicine and rehabilitation, gastroenterology, urology, and basic science.

== History ==
The International Neuromodulation Society (INS) was founded in 1992. In 1994, NANS independently formed as the American Neuromodulation Society and later joined the International Neuromodulation Society as its North American Chapter. It was renamed the North American Neuromodulation Society in 1999.

The American Neuromodulation Society was the brain-child of Ballard Wright and Barry N. Strauss. Wright was largely responsible for incorporating and establishing ANS as a non-profit organization in the United States. In the early days, with Wright volunteering to be the initial Executive Director, the society offices operated through his offices in Lexington, Kentucky.

Now based in Chicago, NANS developed out of the American Neuromodulation Society and has evolved into a national organization with more than 2000 members. The current Executive Director is Keri Kramer.

The annual meetings are held every January, typically located in Las Vegas, Nevada. NANS currently holds a seat in the CPT, RUC and House of Delegates within the American Medical Association (AMA).

The official journal of NANS' parent organization, the INS, is Neuromodulation.

== Presidents ==
- 1994–1998: Michael Stanton-Hicks
- 1998–2001: John C. Oakley
- 2001–2002: Sam Hassenbusch
- 2002–2003: Peter Staats
- 2003–2005: Richard B. North
- 2005–2007: Joshua Prager
- 2007–2009: Jaimie Henderson
- 2009–2011: Robert Foreman
- 2011–2013: Dr. Ali Rezai
- 2013–2015: David Kloth
- 2015–2017: Ashwini Sharan
- 2017–2019: Todd Sitzman
- 2019–2021: Peter Konrad
- 2021–2023: Salim Hayek
- 2023–2024: Julie Pilitsis
- 2024–present: Corey Hunter
