= John Oakley =

John Oakley may refer to:

- John Oakley (surveyor) (1867–1946), British surveyor
- John C. Oakley (1946–2006), American neurosurgeon
- John Oakley (cricketer) (1925–2013), New Zealand cricketer
- John Oakley (priest) (1834–1890), English divine and former Dean of Manchester Cathedral, 1884–1890
