= Journal of Hand Surgery =

Journal of Hand Surgery may refer to:

- Journal of Hand Surgery (American Volume), published by Elsevier
- Journal of Hand Surgery (European Volume), published by SAGE Publications, formerly known as:
  - Journal of Hand Surgery (British Volume)
  - Journal of Hand Surgery (British and European Volume)
