= Neuromodulation (medicine) =

Type of therapy

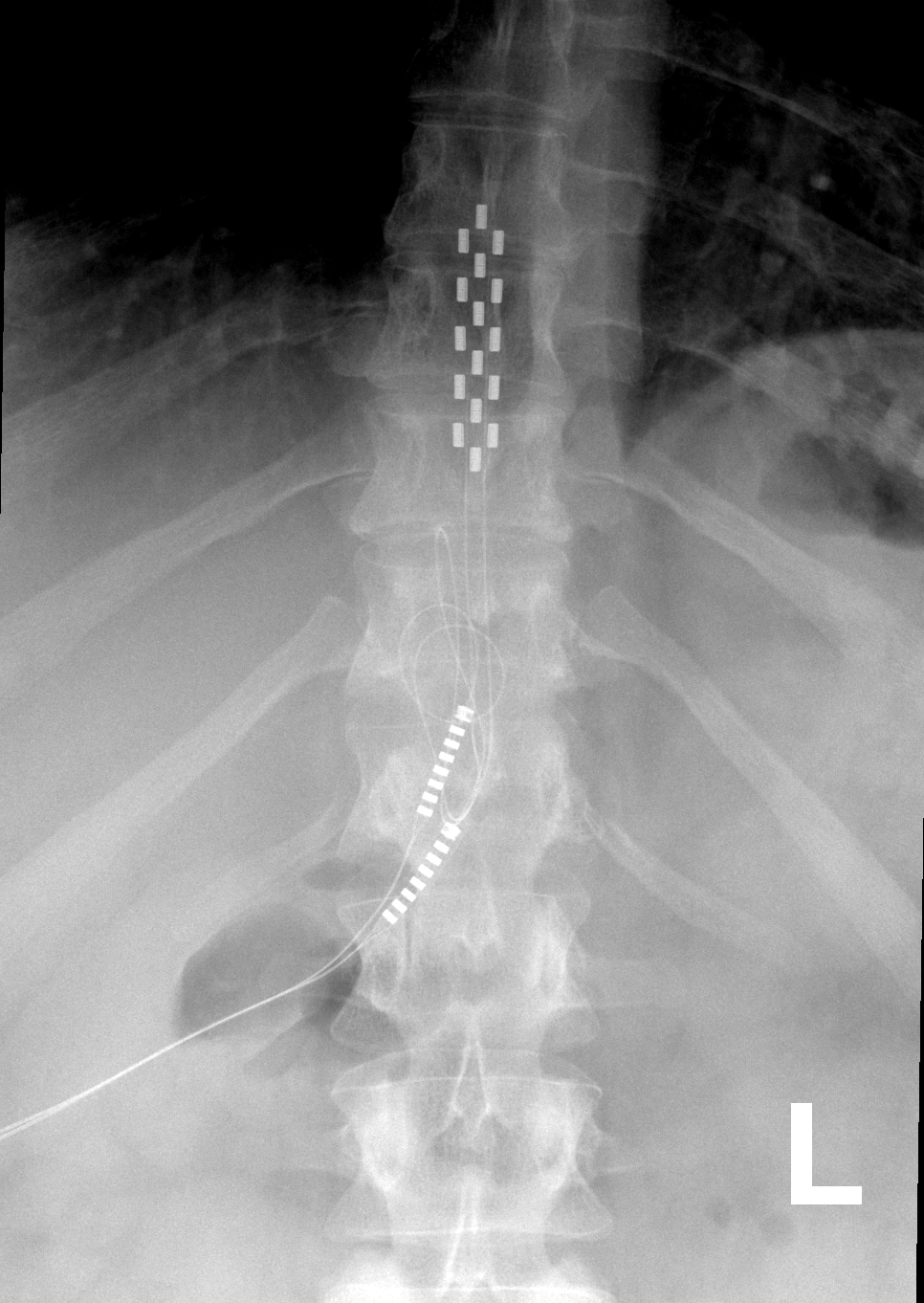
Anterior view X-ray of a Medtronic Spinal Cord Stimulator (SCS) with 5-6-5 paddle lead implanted in the posterior epidural space of the thoracic spine

Neuromodulation is "the alteration of nerve activity through targeted delivery of a stimulus, such as electrical stimulation or chemical agents, to specific neurological sites in the body". It is carried out to normalize – or modulate – nervous tissue function. Neuromodulation is an evolving therapy that can involve a range of electromagnetic stimuli, such as a magnetic field (rTMS), an electric current, or a drug delivered directly into the subdural space (intrathecal drug delivery). Emerging applications involve targeted introduction of genes or gene regulators and light (optogenetics), and by 2014, these had been at minimum demonstrated in mammalian models, or first-in-human data had been acquired. The most clinical experience has been with electrical stimulation.

Neurotherapy, in modern use, is a synonym for neuromodulation. While neurotherapy may have a broader meaning, its modern definition focuses exclusively on technological methods that exert an energy-based effect on the development of a balanced nervous system in order to address symptom control and cure several conditions. Neurotherapy is a medical treatment that implements systemic targeted delivery of an energy stimulus or chemical agents to a specific neurological zone in the body to alter neuronal activity and stimulate neuroplasticity in a way that develops (or balances) a nervous system in order to treat different diseases, restore and/or to improve patients' physical strength, cognitive functions, and overall health.

Neuromodulation, whether electrical or magnetic, employs the body's natural biological response by stimulating nerve cell activity that can influence populations of nerves by releasing transmitters, such as dopamine, or other chemical messengers such as the peptide Substance P, that can modulate the excitability and firing patterns of neural circuits. There may also be more direct electrophysiological effects on neural membranes as the mechanism of action of electrical interaction with neural elements. The end effect is a "normalization" of a neural network function from its perturbed state. Presumed mechanisms of action for neurostimulation include depolarizing blockade, stochastic normalization of neural firing, axonal blockade, reduction of neural firing keratosis, and suppression of neural network oscillations. A recent review (2024) has identified relevant etiological hypotheses of non-invasive neuromodulation in different techniques. Data analysis revealed that mitochondrial activity seems to play a central role in different techniques. Analysis of the mother-fetus neurocognitive model provided insights into the conditions of natural neuromodulation of the fetal nervous system during pregnancy. According to this position, the electromagnetic properties of the mother's heart and its interaction with her own and the fetal nervous system ensure the balanced development of the embryo's nervous system and guarantee the development of the correct architecture of the nervous system with the necessary cognitive functions corresponding to the ecological context and the qualities that make human beings unique. Based on these results, the article suggested the hypothesis of the origin of neurostimulation during gestation. Although the exact mechanisms of neurostimulation remain unknown, the empirical effectiveness has resulted in the surge of its clinical application.

Existing and emerging neuromodulation treatments also include application in medication-resistant epilepsy, chronic head pain conditions, and functional therapy ranging from bladder and bowel or respiratory control to improvement of sensory deficits, such as hearing (cochlear implants and auditory brainstem implants) and vision (retinal implants). Technical improvements include a trend toward minimally invasive (or noninvasive) systems, as well as smaller, more sophisticated devices that may have automated feedback control, and conditional compatibility with magnetic resonance imaging.

Neuromodulation therapy has been investigated for other chronic conditions, such as Alzheimer's disease, depression, chronic pain, and as an adjunctive treatment in recovery from stroke.

== Physiology ==
=== Synaptic plasticity ===
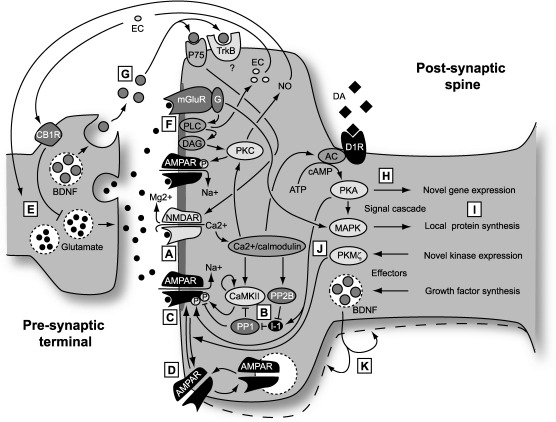
LTP and LTD: Schematic of molecular mechanisms. Research in several nervous system regions has demonstrated a reliable capacity for synapses to undergo long-term changes in efficacy in response to systemic targeted delivery of an energy stimulus. Technological advances in non-invasive manipulation of brain activity and growing insights into mechanisms underlying long-term potentiation and depression now put us at the threshold of harnessing neurotherapeutic approaches in the management of a variety of neurological conditions, including neuropathic pain, epilepsy, depression, amblyopia, tinnitus, and stroke.

Synaptic plasticity, a particular type of neuroplasticity, is the ability of the nervous system to modify the intensity of interneuronal relationships (synapses), to establish new ones and to eliminate some. This property allows the nervous system to modify its structure and functionality in a more or less lasting way, depending on the events that influence it, such as experience or neuromodulation.

=== Neuroplasticity ===
Brain plasticity refers to the ability of the brain to modify its structure and functionality depending on the activity of its neurons, related, for example, to stimuli received from the external environment, in reaction to traumatic lesions or pathological changes, and in relation to the development process of the individual or neuromodulation.

=== A balanced nervous system ===
In the balanced nervous system with required cognitive functions, the sympathetic (SNS) and parasympathetic nervous systems (PNS) operate in synergy while opposing each other. Stimulation of the SNS boosts body activity and attention: it raises heart rate and blood pressure. In contrast, stimulation of the PNS is the rest-and-digest state: it reduces blood pressure and heart rate. The nervous system interplays with the immune system. Through these interactions, the nervous and immune systems ensure the nervous system maintains immune homeostasis.

== Medical uses ==
According to the International Neuromodulation Society, neuromodulation-based therapy "addresses symptom control through nerve stimulation" in the following condition categories:

- Chronic pain
- Movement disorders
- Epilepsy
- Psychiatric disorders
- Brain injury / Stroke
- Cardiovascular disorders
- Gastrointestinal disorders
- Genitourinary and colorectal disorders
- Sensory deficits

== Types ==
Neurotherapy, like many medical therapies, is based on knowledge from conventional medicine, relying on a scientific approach and evidence-based practice. However, some neuromodulation techniques are still attributed to alternative medicine (healthcare procedures "not readily integrated into the dominant healthcare model") because of their novelty and lack of evidence to support them. The wide range of neurotherapy techniques can be divided into three groups based on the application of energy stimulus:

=== Electric energy ===
- Auditory brainstem implant
- Cranial electrotherapy stimulation
- Deep brain stimulation
- Electrical brain stimulation
- Electroanalgesia
- Electroconvulsive therapy (ECT)
- Functional electrical stimulation (FES)
- Hypoglossal nerve stimulation
- Neurofeedback
- Microcurrent electrical neuromuscular stimulator
- Occipital nerve stimulation (ONS)
- Percutaneous tibial nerve stimulation (PTNS)
- Peripheral nerve stimulation
- Sacral nerve stimulation (SNS) / sacral neuromodulation (SNM)
- Transcranial direct current stimulation (tDCS)
- Transcranial alternating current stimulation (tACS)
- Transcranial pulsed current stimulation (tPCS)
- Transcranial random noise stimulation (tRNS)
- Transcutaneous electrical nerve stimulation (TENS)
- Vagus nerve stimulation

=== Magnetic energy ===
- Magnet therapy
- Magnetic resonance therapy
- Repetitive transcranial magnetic stimulation (rTMS)
- Transcranial magnetic stimulation

=== Electromagnetic radiation ===
- Acoustic photonic intellectual neurostimulation (APIN)
- Light therapy (phototherapy)
- Ultraviolet light therapy
- PUVA therapy
- Photodynamic therapy
- Photothermal therapy
- Pulsed electromagnetic field therapy
- Cytoluminescent therapy
- Blood irradiation therapy
- Laser therapy
- Low-level laser therapy
- Transcranial pulsed electromagnetic fields (tPEMF)

== Invasive electrical neuromodulation methods ==
Electrical stimulation using implantable devices came into modern usage in the 1980s, and its techniques and applications have continued to develop and expand. These are methods where an operation is required to position an electrode. The stimulator, with the battery, similar to a pacemaker, may also be implanted, or may remain outside the body.

In general, neuromodulation systems deliver electrical currents and typically consist of the following components: An epidural, subdural, or parenchymal electrode placed via minimally invasive needle techniques (so-called percutaneous leads) or an open surgical exposure to the target (surgical "paddle" or "grid" electrodes), or stereotactic implants for the central nervous system, and an implanted pulse generator (IPG). Depending on the distance from the electrode access point, an extension cable may also be added into the system. The IPG can have either a non-rechargeable battery needing replacement every 2–5 years (depending on stimulation parameters) or a rechargeable battery that is replenished via an external inductive charging system.

Although most systems operate via delivery of a constant train of stimulation, there has recently been an emergence of so-called "feed-forward" stimulation, in which the device's activation is contingent on a physiological event, such as an epileptic seizure. In this circumstance, the device is activated and delivers a desynchronizing pulse to the cortical area that is undergoing an epileptic seizure. This concept of feed-forward stimulation will likely become more prevalent as physiological markers of targeted diseases and neural disorders are discovered and verified. The on-demand stimulation may extend the duration of battery life if sensing and signal-processing demands of the system are sufficiently power-efficient. New electrode designs could yield more efficient and precise stimulation, requiring less current and minimizing unwanted side-stimulation. In addition, to overcome the challenge of preventing lead migration in areas of the body that are subject to motion such as turning and bending, researchers are exploring developing small stimulation systems that are recharged wirelessly rather than through an electrical lead.

=== Spinal cord stimulation ===
Spinal cord stimulation is a form of invasive neuromodulation therapy in common use since the 1980s. Its principal use is as a reversible, non-pharmacological therapy for chronic pain management that delivers mild electrical pulses to the spinal cord. In patients who experience pain reduction of 50 percent or more during a temporary trial, a permanent implant may be offered in which, as with a cardiac pacemaker, an implantable pulse generator about the size of a stopwatch is placed under the skin on the trunk. It delivers mild impulses along slender electrical leads leading to small electrical contacts, about the size of a grain of rice, at the area of the spine to be stimulated.

Stimulation is typically in the 20–200 Hz range, though a novel class of stimulation parameters are now emerging that employ a 10 kHz stimulation train as well as 500 Hz "burst stimulation". Kilohertz stimulation trains have been applied to both the spinal cord proper as well as the dorsal root ganglion in humans. All forms of spinal cord stimulation have demonstrated varying degrees of efficacy in treating a variety of pharmacoresistant neuropathic or mixed (neuropathic and nociceptive) pain syndromes, such as post-laminectomy syndrome, low back pain, complex regional pain syndrome, peripheral neuropathy, peripheral vascular disease, and angina.

The general process for spinal cord stimulation involves a temporary trailing of appropriate patients with an external pulse generator attached to epidural electrodes located in the lower thoracic spinal cord. The electrodes are placed either via a minimally invasive needle technique (so-called percutaneous leads) or an open surgical exposure (surgical "paddle" electrodes).

Patient selection is key, and candidates should pass rigorous psychological screening as well as a medical workup to ensure that their pain syndrome is truly medication-resistant. After recuperating from the implant procedure, the patient will return to have the system turned on and programmed. Depending on the system, the program may elicit a tingling sensation that covers most of the painful area, replacing some of the painful sensations with more of a gentle massaging sensation, although other more recent systems do not create a tingling sensation. The patient is sent home with a handheld remote controller to turn the system off or on or switch between pre-set stimulation parameters, and can follow up to adjust the parameters.

=== Deep brain stimulation ===
Another invasive neuromodulation treatment developed in the 1980s is deep brain stimulation, which may be used to help limit symptoms of movement disorder in Parkinson's disease, dystonia, or essential tremor. Deep brain stimulation was approved by the U.S. Food and Drug Administration in 1997 for essential tremor, in 2002 for Parkinson's disease, and received a humanitarian device exemption from the FDA in 2003 for motor symptoms of dystonia. It was approved in 2010 in Europe for the treatment of certain types of severe epilepsy. DBS also has shown promise, although still in research, for medically intractable psychiatric syndromes of depression, obsessive-compulsive disorders, intractable rage, dementia, and morbid obesity. It has also shown promise for Tourette syndrome, torticollis, and tardive dyskinesia. DBS therapy, unlike spinal cord stimulation, has a variety of central nervous system targets, depending on the target pathology. For Parkinson's disease, central nervous system targets include the subthalamic nucleus, globus pallidus interna, and the ventral intermidus nucleus of the thalamus. Dystonias are often treated by implants targeting globus pallidus interna, or less often, parts of the ventral thalamic group. The anterior thalamus is the target for epilepsy.

DBS research targets include, but are not limited to, the following areas: Cg25 for depression, the anterior limb of the internal capsule for depression as well as obsessive-compulsive disorder (OCD), centromedian/parafasicularis, centromedian thalamic nuclei and the subthalamic nucleus for OCD, anorexia and Tourette syndrome; the nucleus accumbens and ventral striatum have also been assayed for depression and pain.

=== Other invasive electrical methods ===
- Auditory brainstem implant, which provides a sense of sound to a person who cannot use a cochlear implant due to a damaged or missing cochlea or auditory nerve
- Functional electrical stimulation (FES)
- Vagus nerve stimulation (VNS)
- Hypoglossal nerve stimulation, an option for some patients who have obstructive sleep apnea
- Percutaneous tibial nerve stimulation (PTNS) for the treatment of incontinence.
- Peripheral nerve stimulation (PNS, which refers to stimulation of nerves beyond the spine or brain, and may be considered to include occipital or sacral nerve stimulation)
- Occipital nerve stimulation (ONS)
- Sacral nerve stimulation (SNS) / sacral neuromodulation (SNM)

== Non-invasive techniques ==
Noninvasive neuromodulation encompasses several electroceutical techniques: Acoustic photonic intellectual neurostimulation (APIN); Light therapy (LT); Photobiomodulation (PBM); Low-frequency sound stimulations, including Vibroacoustic therapy (VAT) and Rhythmic auditory stimulation (RAS); a group of transcranial electrical and magnetic methods: Transcranial magnetic stimulation (TMS), Repetitive transcranial magnetic stimulation (rTMS), Transcranial pulsed electromagnetic fields (tPEMF), Transcranial direct current stimulation (tDCS), Transcranial alternating current stimulation (tACS), Transcranial pulsed current stimulation (tPCS), Transcranial random noise stimulation (tRNS), Transcutaneous electrical nerve stimulation (TENS). The general principle of these noninvasive techniques is that they exert their functions through inducing mitochondrial stress.

=== Acoustic photonic intellectual neurostimulation ===
The APIN method exerts its therapeutic effect based on the facts that energetic stimuli induce mitochondrial stress, and pulsed electromagnetic fields provide microvascular vasodilation. This approach of natural brain stimulation emulates the features of natural neurostimulation of the fetal nervous system during pregnancy, scaled to the parameters of treatment of a specific patient. Three therapeutic agents during a cognitive test cause oxygenation of neuronal tissues, release of adenosine-5′-triphosphate proteins, and neuronal plasticity, which synergistically lead to rapid pain relief. The APIN method shows significant results in treating chronic pain in several conditions.

=== Non-invasive electrical methods ===
These methods use external electrodes to apply a current to the body in order to change the functioning of the nervous system.

Methods include:

- Transcranial direct current stimulation (tDCS)
- Transcutaneous electrical nerve stimulation (TENS) and a prescription variant of TENS, transcutaneous afferent patterned stimulation (TAPS)
- Electroconvulsive therapy (ECT)

=== Non-invasive magnetic methods ===
Magnetic methods of neuromodulation are normally non-invasive: no surgery is required to allow a magnetic field to enter the body because the magnetic permeability of tissue is similar to that of air. In other words, magnetic fields penetrate the body very easily.

The two main techniques are highly related in that both use changes in magnetic field strength to induce electric fields and ionic currents in the body. There are, however, differences in approach and hardware. In rTMS, the stimulation has a high amplitude (0.5–3 tesla), a low complexity and anatomical specificity is reached through a highly focal magnetic field. In tPEMF, the stimulation has a low amplitude (0.01–500 millitesla), a high complexity and anatomical specificity is reached through the specific frequency content of the signal.

- Repetitive transcranial magnetic stimulation (rTMS)
- Transcranial pulsed electromagnetic fields (tPEMF)

=== Recent developments in non-invasive brain stimulation (TMS / tDCS) ===
During the past several years, both transcranial magnetic stimulation (TMS) and transcranial direct current stimulation (tDCS) have experienced significant evidence, regulatory analysis, and clinical implementation. According to a 2024 review by Desarkar et al., the body of research on the therapeutic application of non-invasive brain stimulation is growing and represents advancements in the quality of study, the parameters used in stimulation, and the mechanics of research, and the authors point to the progress of the research. The review also emphasizes limitations and ongoing challenges, including variability in individual response, the need for more standardized dosing protocols, and the importance of precise targeting based on neuroimaging or computational modeling. These findings update earlier assessments that characterized the evidence base as limited or inconsistent, particularly for tDCS, and reflect the increasing rigor of recent randomized and multi-site trials. Combination Therapies Emerging work has explored the joint use of multiple stimulation modalities. A 2024 clinical study by Zhou et al. reported that combined tDCS and repetitive TMS (rTMS) demonstrated promising benefits for insomnia, suggesting potential synergistic effects when protocols are integrated. The given combination is still under research, but it represents a broader tendency toward multimodal stimulation techniques. Future Directions Recent studies are becoming more concerned with personalizing stimulation parameters, such as individualized targeting, state-dependent stimulation (e.g. on the basis of EEG markers), and dose, frequency, and electrode/magnetic coil placement optimization. Moreover, the development of integrative treatment methods, including the combination of stimulation with cognitive therapy, psychotherapy or neurofeedback, presents a growing field of research.

=== Limitations of non-invasive electrical and magnetic methods ===
Brain tissue stimulation using non-invasive electrical and magnetic methods raises several concerns, including the following:

The first issue is the uncertain dose for healthy stimulation. While neurophysiology lacks knowledge about the nature of such a treatment of nervous diseases at the cellular level, non-invasive electrical and magnetic therapies involve excessive exposure of the brain to an intense field, which is several times and even orders of magnitude higher than natural electromagnetic fields in the brain.

Another significant challenge of non-invasive electrical and magnetic methods is to localize the effect of stimulation on specific neuronal networks that need to be treated. We still need to gain knowledge about mental processes at the cellular level. Neuronal correlates of cognitive functions are still intriguing questions for contemporary research. Non-invasive electrical and magnetic brain tissue stimulation targets a large area of poorly characterized tissue. Therefore, it is unclear whether electrical and magnetic fields reach only the neuronal networks of the brain that need treatment. Again, these methods involve excessive exposure to intense electrical and magnetic fields several times and even orders of magnitude higher than natural ones in the brain. However, non-invasive electrical and magnetic brain tissue methods cannot target only the neuronal networks that need to be treated. The undefined radiation target can destroy healthy cells during therapy.

Additionally, these methods are not generalizable to all patients because of more inter-individual variability in response to brain stimulation.

== Mechanisms ==
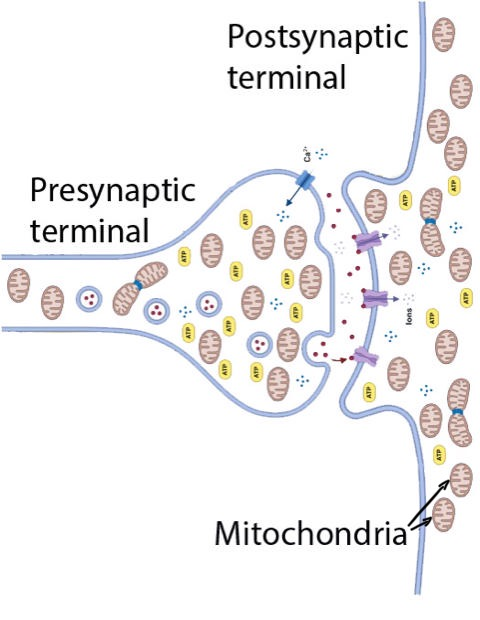
Synapses during neurotherapy. Neurotherapy, through targeted delivery of energy stimuli, alters mitochondrial activity. Mitochondria are highly concentrated at synapses. Thus, mitochondrial activity facilitates synaptic transmission by generating adenosine triphosphate (ATP) and regulating calcium (Ca2+) levels. Neurons rely on locally produced ATP to meet the high energy demands of synaptic activity.

The origins behind the way that an external energy stimulus alters neuronal activity and stimulates neuroplasticity during various artificial neurostimulation techniques are still under discussion. Electrical and magnetic energy are two forms of energy that are closely interconnected: a moving charge induces electrical and magnetic fields. Electrical current creates a magnetic field, and a magnetic field induces an electrical charge movement. Neurons are electrically active cells. Neuronal oscillations have a dual role in a synapse: they are affected by spiking inputs and, in turn, impact the timing of spike outputs. Because of the above facts, both electrical and magnetic fields may induce electrical currents in neuronal circuits. Therefore, similar mechanisms of altered neuronal activity may underlie different neuromodulation techniques that use electrical, magnetic, or electromagnetic energy in treatment.

A variety of hypotheses try to explain the mechanisms that contribute to synaptic activity during neurostimulation. According to empirical data, Ca2+ and Na+ channel activity can be altered by static magnetic fields and low-frequency pulsed electromagnetic fields. The voltage-gated Ca2+ channels are the primary conduits for the Ca2+ ions that cause a confluence of neurotransmitter-containing vesicles with the presynaptic membrane. The altered activity of Ca2+ and Na+ channel changes the timing and strength of synaptic output, contributing to neuronal excitability.

Another perspective hypothesis suggests that electromagnetic fields increase in adenosine receptors release, which facilitates neuronal communication. Because A(2A) adenosine receptors control the release of other neurotransmitters (e.g., glutamate and dopamine), this contributes to adjusting neuronal functions.

According to the natural neurostimulation hypothesis, energy stimuli induce mitochondrial stress and microvascular vasodilation. These promote increasing Adenosine triphosphate (ATP) protein and oxygenation, inducing synaptic strength. This position explains neuromodulation from different scale levels: from interpersonal dynamics to nonlocal neuronal coupling. According to natural neurostimulation, the innate natural mechanism of physical interactions between the mother and embryo ensures the balanced development of the embryonic nervous system. The drivers of these interactions, the electromagnetic properties of the mother's heart, enable brain waves to interact between the mother's and fetal nervous systems. The electromagnetic and acoustic oscillations of the mother's heart converge the neuronal activity of both nervous systems in an ensemble, shaping harmony from a cacophony of separate oscillations. These interactions synchronize brain oscillations, influencing neuroplasticity in the fetus. During the mother's intentional actions with her environment, these interchanges provide hints to the fetus's nervous system, binding synaptic activity with relevant stimuli. This hypothesis posits that the physiological processes of mitochondrial stress induction (affecting neuronal plasticity) and vasodilation, which cooperatively increase microvascular blood flow and tissue oxygenation, are the basis of the natural neurostimulation. It is also thought to be a foundation of many non-invasive artificial neuromodulation techniques. Because if the mother-fetus interactions allow the child's nervous system to grow with adequate biological sentience, similar (while scaling) environmental interactions can heal the damaged nervous system in adults.

== Invasive chemical methods ==
Chemical neuromodulation is always invasive, because a drug is delivered in a highly specific location of the body. The non-invasive variant is traditional pharmacotherapy, e.g. swallowing a tablet.

- Intrathecal drug delivery systems (ITDS, which may deliver micro-doses of painkiller (for instance, ziconotide) or anti-spasm medicine (such as baclofen) directly to the site of action)

== Teleneurotherapy ==
Teleneurotherapy utilizes computers and communication technology to execute neurotherapy remotely. Organisms receive physical stimuli, such as sounds (through mechanoreceptors and mitochondria across different organ systems) and light (through photoreceptors located in the retina and mitochondria) that alter neuronal activity in specific brain zones. Research indicates that systematic physical stimuli produced by standard electronic devices, such as tablets and headphones, may treat online injured nervous systems by modulating neuronal plasticity. Teleneurotherapy "emulates the central parameters of natural brain stimulation during gestation." "Because natural neurostimulation contributes to the balanced development of the nervous system in fetuses with adequate biological sentience, the scaled parameters of these natural forces can potentially treat an injured nervous system in adults." Evidence suggests that teleneurotherapy can enable neurological treatment if it considers key parameters of the mother-fetus interaction that provide the therapeutic effect in case of a systematic impact. Recent research implemented the APIN method (see above) in the online treatment of patients with different neurological conditions, which showed significant therapeutic effects.

== Licensing and regulation ==
In the European Union, in the scope of medical devices, the European Court places them in some relation to a specific medical purpose: treating a disease or illness. The Court held that regulating devices that do not explicitly manifest medical benefits as medical devices would run counter to the rationale and lead to overregulation. "The legal foundation for regulating medical devices in the EU is the MDR (Regulation (EU) 2017/745), which was adopted in 2016 and came into effect in 2021. The MDR stipulates that for non-medical devices, the 'requirement to demonstrate a clinical benefit (…) shall be understood as a requirement to demonstrate the performance of the device' (Article 61 para 9 MDR). In other words, devices must demonstrate that they function in the way claimed by manufacturers, instead of showing a therapeutic benefit. Moreover, with respect to the safety of non-medical Annex XVI devices, the MDR lays down the following: For the devices referred to in Annex XVI, the general safety requirements (…) shall be understood to mean that the device, when used under the conditions and for the purposes intended, does not present a risk at all or presents a risk that is no more than the maximum acceptable risk related to the product's use which is consistent with a high level of protection for the safety and health of persons(MDR, Annex I, Article 9). The MDR sets an absolute risk threshold for the non-medical devices listed in Annex XVI, including non-invasive brain stimulation. Risks arising from their use should not exceed the threshold of 'maximum acceptable risks'. The new implementing regulations seek to specify this threshold." While devices for neurostimulation with an intended medical purpose require a pre-market approval, their direct-to-consumer products are only subjected to the CE marking of conformity. The EU lacks specific regulations and directives dedicated to neurotechnologies. Therefore, any physician, nurse, psychologist, occupational therapist, or specialist in neurotechnology and bioengineering may conduct neurotherapy.

In the United States, the Food and Drug Administration (FDA) does not regulate neurotherapy (since it is the practice of medicine). "Licenses—such as those for physicians, registered nurses, and dentists—are typically obtained after providing evidence of education and training; some require proof of passing written and/or clinical exams. Licenses allow individuals to provide a specific set of services that are considered to be within the limits of one's field, or "scope of practice". That is, licenses, for example, for physicians and registered nurses, allow them to practice neurotherapy that is considered within their area of specialty or scope of practice.

== Relationship to electroceuticals ==
In 2012, the global pharmaceutical company GlaxoSmithKline announced an initiative in bioelectric medicine in which the autonomic nervous system's impact on the immune system and inflammatory disease might be treated through electrical stimulation rather than pharmaceutical agents. The company's first investment in 2013 involved a small startup company, SetPoint Medical, which was developing neurostimulators to address inflammatory autoimmune disorders such as rheumatoid arthritis.

Ultimately, the electroceuticals quest aims to find the electro-neural signature of disease and, at a cellular level, in real time, play back the more normal electro-signature to help maintain the neural signature in the normal state. Unlike preceding neuromodulation therapy methods, the approach would not involve electrical leads stimulating large nerves or spinal cords or brain centers. It might involve methods that are emerging within the neuromodulation family of therapies, such as optogenetics or some new nanotechnology. Disease states and conditions that have been discussed as targets for future electroceutical therapy include diabetes, infertility, obesity, rheumatoid arthritis, and autoimmune disorders.

== History ==
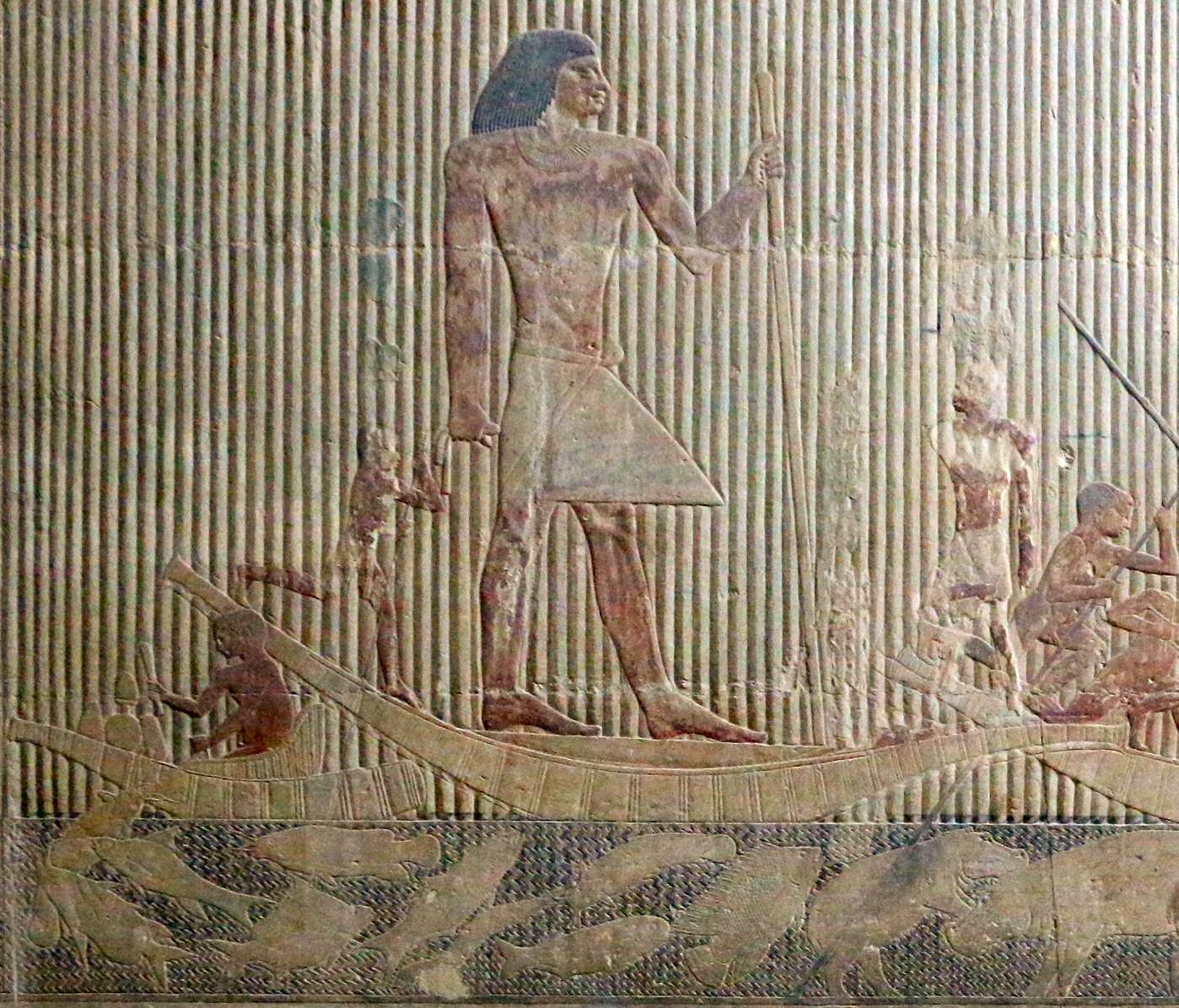
Electric catfish in Mastaba of Ti bas-relief colour

While neurotherapy is a relatively young medical treatment in conventional Western biomedicine (that relies on a scientific approach and evidence-based practice), different age-old cultural practices of traditional Indian, Egyptian, and Chinese medicine have been using neuromodulation elements thousands of years ago.

Long before humans discovered the science of electricity, ancient physicians used electric currents to treat various physical and mental conditions, including epilepsy, vertigo, and depression. In the ancient world, nature fulfilled many roles now served by technology, including providing sources of electricity. Before electricity was formally understood, people utilized electric fish to deliver therapeutic shocks. The Egyptians knew of the Nile catfish (Malapterurus electricus), capable of producing electric shocks. A depiction of this fish, dating back to 2750 BC, is found in a mural in the tomb of the architect Ti at Saqqara, Egypt. Egyptians weren't the only Mediterranean culture to feature the catfish in their art; similar murals appeared in the Roman city of Pompeii some 3,000 years later, though 1,000 miles to the north. While these murals don't confirm whether the fish were used medically, ancient Egyptian writings on papyri from 4,700 years ago document their use in pain relief. Later historians like Pliny and Plutarch also noted that Egyptians employed electric eels to treat joint pain, migraines, depression, and epilepsy. The first documented use of electrical stimulation for pain relief dates back to 46 AD when Scribonius Largus of the ancient Roman Empire used the electric properties of torpedo fish to relieve headaches.

Scientific studies of neuromodulation began in 1745, when German physician De Haen published "a number of cases of spasmodic, paralytic and other nervous affections cured by electricity".

The first implementation of electrocutical apparatus in hospital medical treatment recorded in Middlesex Hospital of London in 1767.

In 1780, Italian physicist and biologist Luigi Galvani investigated how electrical signals in nerves could control muscle movement, further evidence of the electrical nature of the neuronal activity.

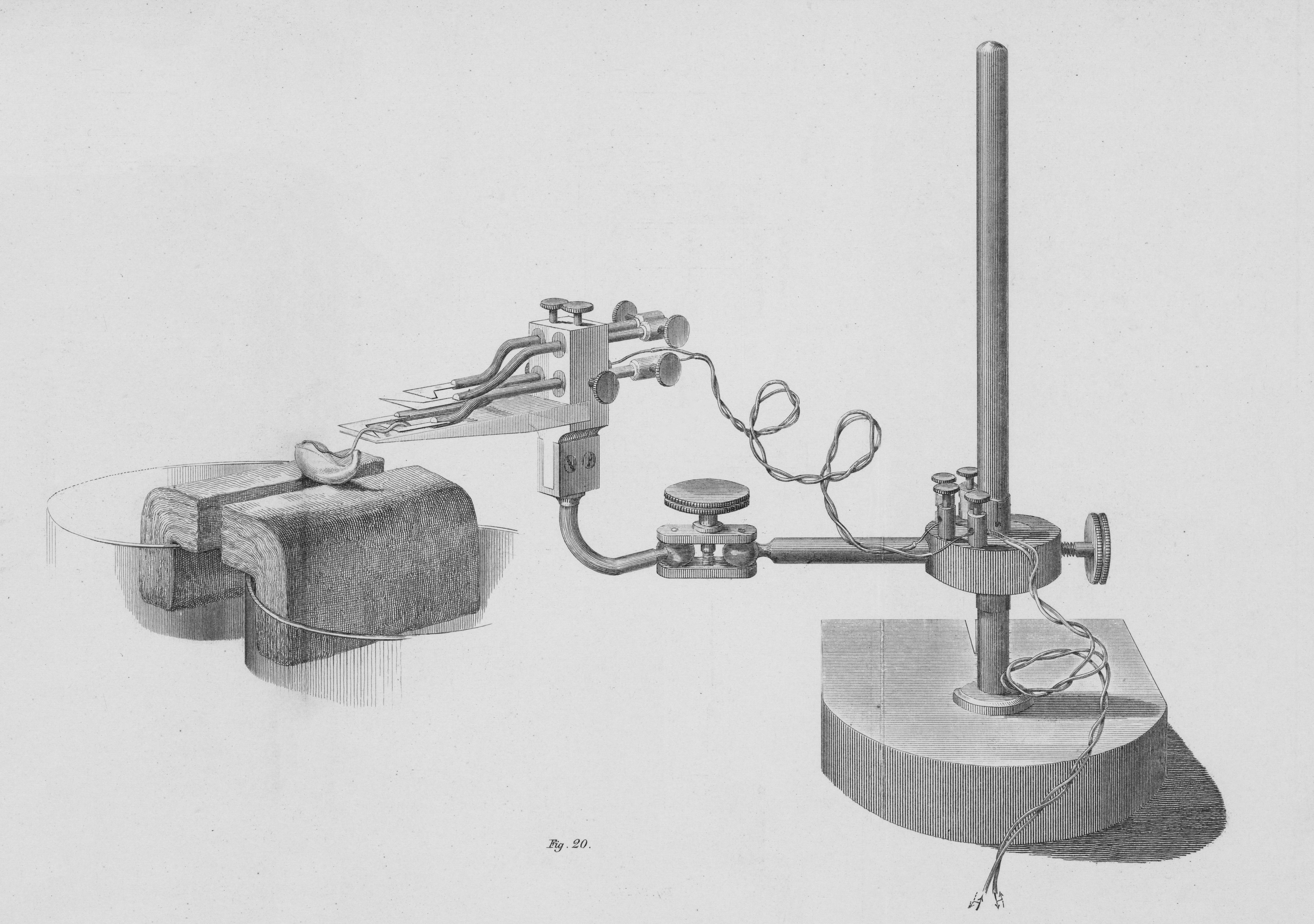
Electrical apparatus used to detect nerve signals. From Emil du Bois-Reymond, "Investigations in Animal Electricity" (1848).

Galvani's hypothesis was proven in 1843 by Carlo Matteucci and Emil du Bois-Reymond with their discovery of the action potential. Du Bois-Reymond went on to devise a variety of electrical devices to stimulate and measure electrical activity in nerves and muscles, which he demonstrated to large audiences in Berlin, Paris, and London.

In 1856, Guillaume Duchenne photographed electrotherapeutic stimulation of muscle contractions, stating that alternating current was superior to direct current in this stimulation.

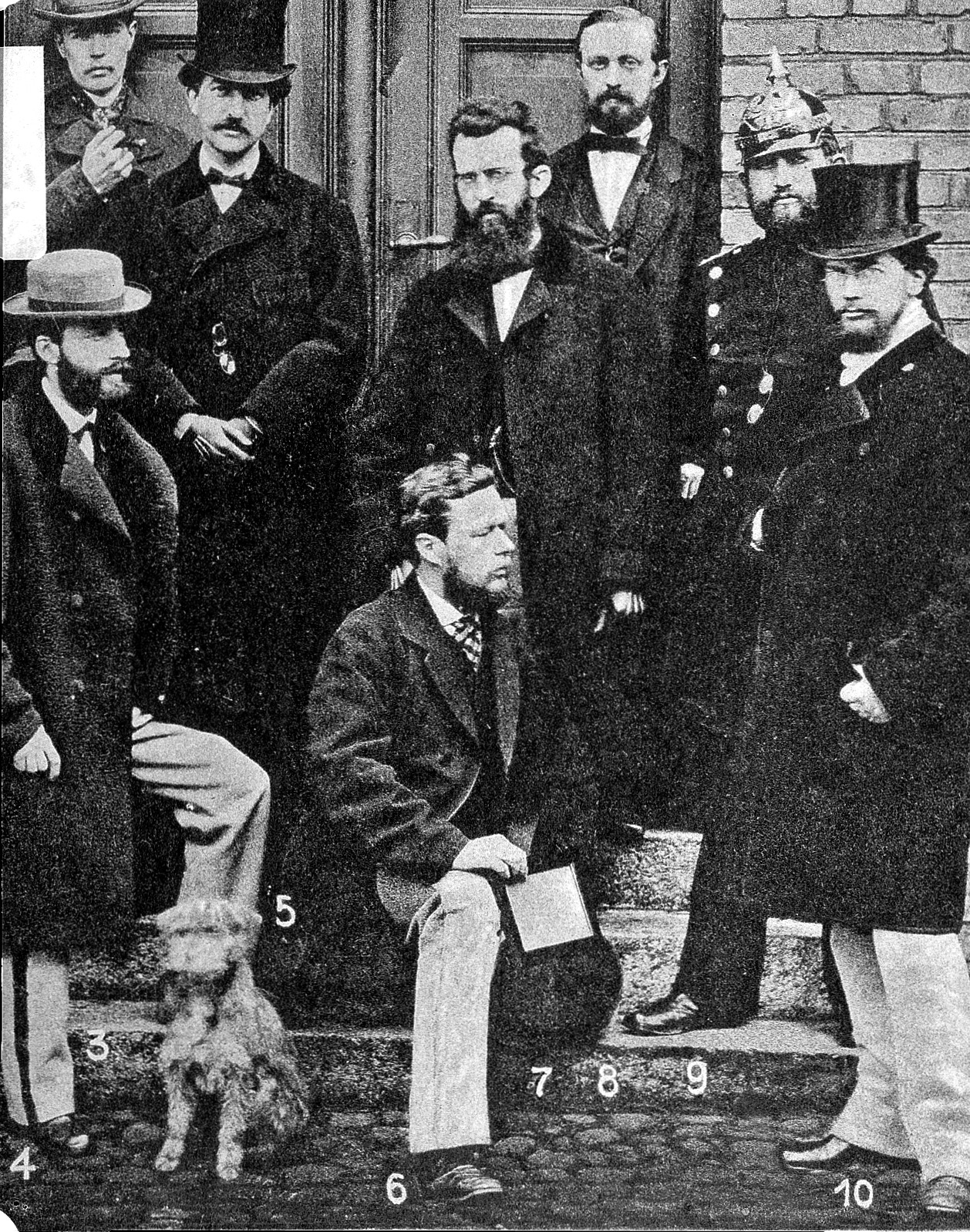
Portrait of G. Fritsch and E. Hitzig, about 1866

In 1870, German physicians Gustav Fritsch and Eduard Hitzig reported the modulation of brain activity in dogs by electrical stimulation of the motor cortex.

In 1887, Spanish neuroanatomist professor Santiago Ramón y Cajal improved the Golgi's method of visualizing nervous tissue under light microscopy by using a technique he termed "double impregnation". He discovered a number of facts about the organization of the nervous system: the nerve cell as an independent cell, insights into degeneration and regeneration, and ideas on brain plasticity.

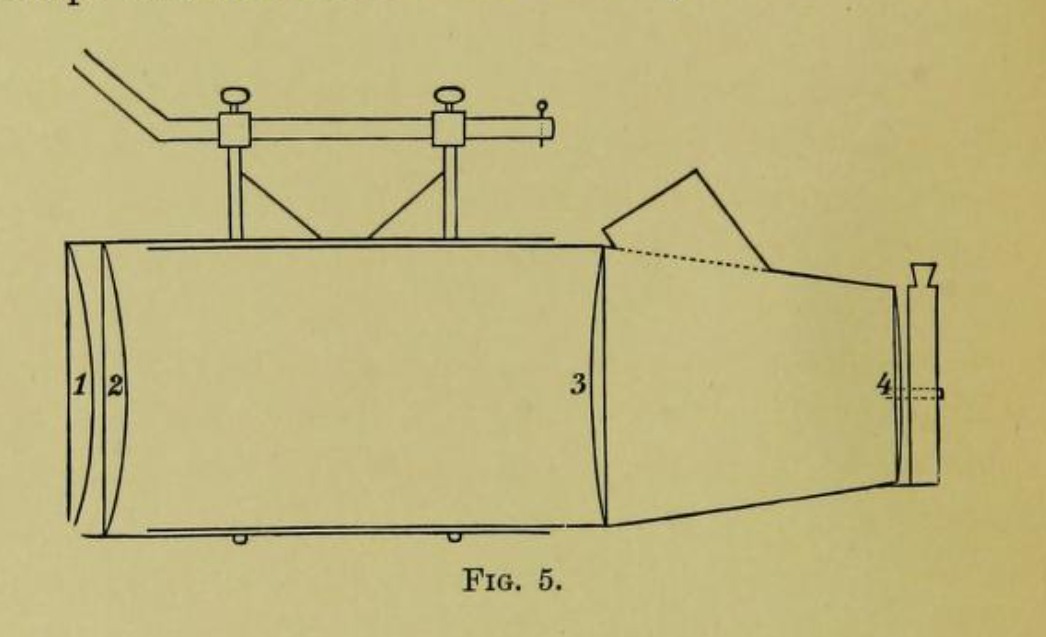
The apparatus for the Phototherapy, 1893. Professor Finsen invented the apparatus, which transformed "the diverging rays" of the artificial light created by a voltaic arc "into parallel" ones. "At the end of the apparatus is attached a very flat cylinder, closed at its two extremities by flat glasses, and filled with an ammoniacal solution of sulphate of copper (light filter)."

In 1893, Prof. Niels Ryberg Finsen (1860–1904) began to treat lupus vulgaris, a tubercular condition of the skin, in the direct mode with heat-filtered light from a carbon arc lamp. He established the Phototherapy treatment at the Whitechapel Hospital in London, which had a Light Department in the first decade of the 20th century. His activity had royal patronage, and Niels Ryberg Finsen received the Nobel Prize in 1903.

In 1894, neurologist and psychiatrist Edward Flatau published a human brain atlas, "Atlas of the Human Brain and the Course of the Nerve-Fibres," which consisted of long-exposure photographs of fresh brain sections. It contained an overview of the knowledge of the time on the fibre pathways in the central nervous system.

In 1924, the German psychiatrist Hans Berger attached electrodes to the scalp and detected small currents in the brain.

In the 1940s, the US War Department investigated the use of electrical stimulation and used so-called "galvanic exercises" on the atrophied hands of patients with ulnar nerve damage from wound surgery, not only to slow and prevent atrophy, but also to restore muscle mass and strength.

In the mid-20th century, the scientific study of neuromodulation in humans expanded significantly. Neurologist Professor Spiegel and neurosurgeon Professor Weissys of Temple University presented a stereotactic device to perform "ablation procedures" in humans; in 1947, "intraoperative electrical stimulation" was introduced to test the brain's target zone before surgery.

=== Deep brain stimulation ===
Earlier practitioners of deep brain stimulation in the latter half of the 20th century (Delgado, Heath, Hosbuchi. See Hariz et al. for historical review) were limited by the technology available. Heath, in the 1950s, stimulated subcortical areas and made detailed observations of behavioral changes. In the 1950s, Professor Heath reported on subcortical stimulation with precise descriptions of behavioral changes.

A new understanding of pain perception was ushered in in 1965, with the Gate Theory of Wall and Melzack, allowing the beginning a gradual move away from destructive surgical treatments such as cutting nerves and towards reversible, modulatory treatments: neuromodulation. Although now considered oversimplified, the theory held that pain transmissions from small nerve fibers can be overridden, or the gate "closed", by competing transmissions along the wider touch nerve fibers. Building on that concept, in 1967, the first dorsal column stimulator for pain control was demonstrated by Dr. Norm Shealy at Western Reserve Medical School, using a design adapted by Tom Mortimer, a graduate student at Case Institute of Technology, from cardiac nerve stimulators by Medtronic, Inc., where he had a professional acquaintance who shared the circuit diagram. In 1973, Hosbuchi reported alleviating the denervation facial pain of anesthesia dolorosa through ongoing electrical stimulation of the somatosensory thalamus, marking the start of the age of deep brain stimulation.

Despite the limited clinical experience in these decades, that era is remarkable for the demonstration of the role technology has in neuromodulation, and there are some case reports of deep brain stimulation for a variety of problems, real or perceived. Delgado hinted at the power of neuromodulation with his implants in the bovine septal region and the ability of electrical stimulation to blunt or alter behavior. Further attempts at this "behavioral modification" in humans were difficult and seldom reliable, and contributed to the overall lack of progress in central nervous system neuromodulation from that era. Attempts at intractable pain syndromes were met with more success, but again hampered by the quality of technology. In particular, the so-called DBS "zero" electrode (consisting of a contact loop on its end) had an unacceptable failure rate, and revisions were fraught with more risk than benefit. Overall, attempts at using electrical stimulation for "behavioral modification" were difficult and seldom reliable, slowing development of DBS. Attempts at addressing intractable pain syndromes with DBS were met with more success, but again hampered by the quality of technology. A number of physicians who hoped to address hitherto intractable problems sought development of more specialized equipment; for instance, in the 1960s, Wall's colleague Bill Sweet recruited engineer Roger Avery to make an implantable peripheral nerve stimulator. Avery started the Avery Company, which made a number of implantable stimulators. Shortly before his retirement in 1983, he submitted data requested by the FDA, which had begun to regulate medical devices following a 1977 meeting on the topic, regarding DBS for chronic pain. Medtronic and Neuromed also made deep brain stimulators at the time, but reportedly felt a complex safety and efficacy clinical trial in patients who were difficult to evaluate would be too costly for the size of the potential patient base, so did not submit clinical data on DBS for chronic pain to the FDA, and that indication was de-approved.

However, near this time in France and elsewhere, DBS was investigated as a substitute for lesioning of brain nuclei to control motor symptoms of movement disorders such as Parkinson's disease, and by the mid-1990s, this reversible, non-destructive stimulation therapy had become the primary application of DBS in appropriate patients, to slow progression of movement impairment from the disease and reduce side effects from long-term, escalating medication use.

=== Cochlear implants ===
In parallel to the development of neuromodulation systems to address motor impairment, cochlear implants were the first neuromodulation system to reach a broad commercial stage to address a functional deficit; they provide sound perception in users who are hearing-impaired due to missing or damaged sensory cells (cilia) in the inner ear. The approach to electrical stimulation used in cochlear implants was soon modified by one manufacturer, Boston Scientific Corporation, for design of electrical leads to be used in spinal cord stimulation treatment of chronic pain conditions.

=== Implantable devices ===
The development of implantable devices like pacemakers and spinal cord stimulators also began in the mid-20th century.

Devices to manage pain received FDA (USA) approval in the late 1960s.

In 1967, Dr. Norm Shealy from Western Reserve Medical School presented "the first dorsal column stimulator for pain control". It was developed based on the Gate Theory of Wall and Melzack, which stated that pain transmissions from tiny nerve fibers would be blocked if competing transmissions were made along larger sensory nerve fibers.

In 1973, Prof Hosbuchi reported relieving the denervation facial pain of anesthesia dolorosa via lasting electrical stimulation of the somatosensory thalamus, which marked the beginning of the age of deep-brain stimulation.

In 1987, the team of neurosurgeons/neurologists Professor Benabid and Professor Pollak and their colleagues (Grenoble, France) published results on this topic about thalamic Deep Brain Stimulation. Deep brain stimulation began to be used to treat motor symptoms of movement disorders such as Parkinson's disease.

In 1989, the International Neuromodulation Society (INS) was founded in Paris after the first International Congress on Epidural Spinal Cord Stimulation in Groningen, the Netherlands, by a select group of physicians: Dr. Augustinsson, a Swedish neurosurgeon; Dr. Galley, a French cardiologist; Dr. Illis, a British neurologist; Dr. Kranick, a German neurosurgeon: Dr. Meglio, an Italian Neurosurgeon; Dr. Sier, a Dutch vascular surgeon and Dr. Staal, a Dutch neurosurgeon.

In 2021, it was registered that shaping the electrical field could trigger a natural neurological mechanism of lateral or surround inhibition, leading to fast-onset sub-perception Spinal cord stimulation. Lateral inhibition promotes refining somatosensory information. Ascending dorsal root ganglia (DRG) fibers transmit excitatory impulses to higher-order neurons and inhibitory interneurons, which communicate with neighboring relay neurons. Thus, neurons encircling the primary target of an ascending stimulated DRG axon are inhibited, which decreases the "noise" in the system and induces higher-order neurons to trigger only when they obtain a strong and consistent signal. Further progress was made in 2022, with study results on adjusting stimulation fields to preferentially target dorsal horn dendrites, a key site for initial pain processing, rather than axons.

=== Natural neurostimulation ===
In 2024, the theory of Natural Neurostimulation was introduced, opening the way to neurostimulation techniques which emulate, in neurological treatment, natural processes that appear during pregnancy. This notion was established by Prof Igor Val Danilov and his colleagues from Latvian universities. Latvian scientists claim that natural neurostimulation provides positive neuroplasticity, balancing the patient's nervous system in a case of systematic use of this sort of neurostimulation, emulating the natural process that causes mitochondrial and cognitive stress under similar environment. They provided evidence of the therapeutic effect of the complex impact of electromagnetic fields and acoustic waves, along with cognitive load, scaled based on the parameters of the physical interaction between mother and fetus.

== See also ==
- Alim-Louis Benabid
- Brain computer interfacing (BCI)
- BrainGate
- International Neuromodulation Society
- Interventional pain management
- North American Neuromodulation Society
- Neuroimmunology
- Neuromodulation (journal)
- Neuroprosthetics
- Neurotechnology
- Neurotherapy
- Neurostimulation
- Non-invasive cerebellar stimulation
- Optogenetics
- Visual prosthesis
