= Joshua Prager =

Joshua Prager may refer to:

- Joshua Prager (writer) (born 1971), former writer for the Wall Street Journal and author of The Echoing Green
- Joshua Prager (doctor) (born 1949), neurophysician
