= Fisher Wallace Laboratories =

American electronics company

Fisher Wallace Laboratories, Inc., headquartered in New York City, markets the Fisher Wallace Stimulator, a cranial electrotherapy stimulation (CES) device. The company was founded in 2007 by entrepreneur Charles Avery Fisher, son of electronics pioneer Avery Fisher, and Martin Wallace. The company acquired its lead product from Saul and Bernard Liss in 2006. Inc. magazine rated the company as being #983 (in 2014) and #1447 (in 2015) in its "Inc. 5000" listing. The Lisses had already obtained 510K marketing clearance from the Food and Drug Administration to treat anxiety, depression, and insomnia when Fisher-Wallace acquired it.

Fisher-Wallace renamed the device as the FW-100 Cranial Stimulator Device, and it was approved for marketing by Health Canada in 2014 under Licence No. 92984; in 2015 Health Canada received a complaint about Fisher Wallace's marketing on its website and sent an enforcement letter concerning the false marketing, which the company corrected. A 2014 Cochrane review found insufficient evidence to determine whether CES devices with alternating current are safe and effective for treating depression.

Fisher-Wallace is a late entry to the CES field; such devices have been marketed since the 1940s, especially in Russia. It has heavily marketed its device via YouTube and other media with pitches that, according to Jessa Gamble writing in Aeon, have "all the trappings of a late-night infomercial".

Fisher was credited by Neurotech Reports editor and publisher James Cavuoto with playing a leading role in the FDA's 2014 withdrawal of its earlier proposal to require companies marketing CES devices to conduct new clinical trials to prove the safety and efficacy of the devices and to submit Premarket Approval applications in order to continue marketing the devices; the company had alleged that the FDA improperly barred an expert in the field from attending a 2014 advisory meeting to discuss the proposed regulation. In 2016, in response to the FDA's next effort to regulate the device class, the company alleged that there was "evidence of regulatory misconduct" and called for an investigation.
