= Sorin Group =

The Sorin Group was a medical products group based in Italy, with significant operations in France, the United States, and Japan, specializing in cardiac devices. Its product lines include replacement heart valves, oxygenators, perfusion tubing sets, cardiothoracic surgery accessories, data monitoring, heart-lung machines, autotransfusion systems, and cannulae, and a line of blood management products.

It began as a nuclear research company owned primarily by Fiat, transformed into a biomedical company upon nationalization of Italy's electric system, sold to SNIA S.p.A., and finally spun off as a separate company listed on the Milan Stock Exchange. Along the way, it and its earlier parent companies bought and sold various other companies, including Dideco, Stöckert, and ELA Medical.

On February 26, 2015, Sorin Group announced that it will merge with fellow medical devices maker Cyberonics to form a new UK-based company called LivaNova.

== History ==
Sorin is an acronym for Società Ricerche Impianti Nucleari (Company for Nuclear Plant Research). It was founded in 1956 by Fiat and Montedison, Italy's two largest industrial groups at that time, to tackle the problems inherent in the production of nuclear energy. Sorin was created as a research company and was equipped with an experimental reactor for materials research. It was intended to serve as the "brain" that would mastermind the nuclear energy projects that the two groups were planning. At the time, Sorin did not have ambitions in the medical field. However, in the decade following its founding, it accumulated significant technological know-how in all of the major areas of science. This was because nuclear energy requires expertise in many areas, from electronics to chemistry, materials technology and even experimental physics. After 10 years in business, Sorin had become a repository of knowledge and skills that were important for the country as a whole.

When the nuclear power industry was hit by a crisis caused by the nationalization of the electric utilities, the Company switched businesses, focusing on technologies related to medicine, and changed its name to Sorin Biomedica (Fiat Group). The conversion was successful: in just three years, Sorin Biomedica became a self-sustaining, profitable company. This success greatly enhanced the Company's image both in Italy and Europe, as Sorin was the only European nuclear research company that was able to transform itself into an industrial company with vast technological know-how. Over the years, Sorin continued to expand, acquiring competitors in Italy and abroad - in France and the United States in particular.

In 1985, Sorin Biomedica listed its shares on the Milan Stock Exchange. In 1986 it was taken over by Snia, when Fiat conveyed a 75% interest in Sorin Biomedica to Snia.

In 1992, Sorin Biomedica purchased Shiley, the Cardiovascular Devices Division of a group headed by Pfizer Inc., a U.S. company. The acquisition included (i) Dideco, an Italian company that was the European leader in the market for extracorporeal blood circulation and autologous blood transfusion products, and (ii) Stöckert, a leading world producer and distributor of heart-lung machines, as well as their subsidiaries. With these acquisitions, Sorin Biomedica established itself as an international player with a leadership position in Europe and a global distribution network. Penetration of the U.S. market - the world's largest - remained limited.

In 1996, Sorin Biomedica launched its own program to create a line of coronary angioplasty products – catheters and stents. The project was based on the company's previous experience with artificial cardiac valves and Carbofilm coating technology. The Carbostent was designed as a balloon-expandable coronary stent coated with Carbofilm; development started in the late 1990s and initial clinical experience in 1998. Sorin Biomedica subsequently introduced the Carbostent commercially, and the device was documented among the coronary stents available in Europe in the early 2000s.

In 1997, the Group divested its Immunodiagnostics operations, since their development would have required massive investments in R&D to keep pace with technological evolution. Moreover, they offered no synergies with the Group's Cardiovascular Medical Devices operations, which had become its core business following the acquisition of Shiley.

In May 1999, Snia bought Cobe Cardiovascular, a company based in Denver, Colorado, that was its main competitor in the cardiac surgery market. This acquisition propelled Sorin Biomedica to the top of the world cardiovascular market and made it the U.S. leader in the industry. The old Shiley operations were transferred to Denver, and the Cobe/Dideco/Sorin sales organizations were quickly streamlined.

In 2000, Sorin Biomedica was merged into and absorbed by Snia, and its shares were withdrawn from listing. In May 2001, the Snia Group purchased Ela Medical from Sanofi - Synthélabo. The acquisition of Ela Medical, a company with production facilities in Paris, France, strengthened the Group's position in the cardiac rhythm management market (pacemakers and implantable defibrillators). Ela Medical's assets included a vast portfolio of patents, a direct sales presence in the U.S. market and a line of FDA-approved products, as well as a respectable share of the European market.

In April 2002, the Snia Group acquired from Dialinvest S.A. control of Soludia, a French company specializing in the manufacture of dialysis solutions, thereby strengthening the product portfolio and European presence of the Renal Care Business Unit. In January 2003, the Snia Group bought from Centerpulse the CarboMedics Group, a U.S. producer of mechanical heart valves based in Austin, Texas, and Mitroflow, a Canadian-based producer of tissue valves. This acquisition significantly strengthened the position of the Sorin Group in the cardiovascular industry and increased its penetration of the U.S. market. In addition, the acquisition made Sorin the world co-leader in mechanical heart valves and significantly expanded its tissue valve business.

In January 2004, following Snia's partial proportional demerger, the Sorin Group, which is headed by the holding company Sorin S.p.A., had been listed independently on the Online Stock Market of Borsa Italiana.

The facility in Arvada, Colorado had been downsizing its operations for a decade until the operations in Plymouth, Minnesota was transferred to the vacant Arvada facility.
