= Non-invasive vagus nerve stimulation devices =

VNS device companies

Non-invasive vagus nerve stimulation (nVNS) devices deliver stimulation to the vagus nerve without surgical implantation. They are under investigation for potential roles in regulating the autonomic nervous system and in conditions such as stress, anxiety, and sleep disturbance.

While interest in these devices has grown, many public resources and reviews are paid advertisements or sponsored content, which may present biased or incomplete information. Peer-reviewed, large-scale clinical studies are limited for many commercially available products.

== Classifications ==
=== Cervical electrical VNS ===
Cervical electrical VNS devices deliver transcutaneous electrical impulses to the cervical vagus nerve through the neck.

- ElectroCore (gammaCore): An FDA-cleared handheld device indicated for the acute treatment of migraine and cluster headaches.
- TruVaga: A portable cervical stimulator marketed for stress and anxiety reduction; as of 2025, independent peer-reviewed clinical evidence is limited.
- Pulsetto: A consumer device marketed for relaxation and sleep. As of 2025, it has not been evaluated in peer-reviewed clinical trials. Independent reviewers have reported that Pulsetto used imagery from unrelated scientific studies in its marketing materials, a practice described as misleading or scientifically inappropriate.
- TENS devices: Standard transcutaneous electrical nerve stimulation (TENS) units, commonly used for pain, have been adapted experimentally for cervical vagal stimulation, though they are not specifically cleared for this purpose.

=== Auricular electrical VNS ===
Auricular electrical stimulation targets the vagus nerve fibers accessible through the outer ear.

- Alpha-Stim: A device delivering microcurrents via ear-clip electrodes. It has been investigated in small clinical studies for anxiety, insomnia, and depression.
- Nurosym by Parasym: A wearable auricular neuromodulation device marketed for autonomic regulation. Nurosym is CE marked in Europe as medical device. Parasym has pioneered independent placebo controlled research using its auricular vagal neuromodulation system in cardiovascular conditions, long-covid and neuroenhancement although large-scale validation is currently pending. Parasym also produces a consumer device for the US market called Nuropod, which featured in Bryan Johnson's Netflix documentary "Don't Die: The Man Who Wants to Live Forever".

=== Mechanical vibration VNS ===
Devices using mechanical vibration aim to stimulate vagal pathways indirectly via vibratory signals.

- Apollo Neuro: A wearable that applies low-frequency vibrations to the body. A feasibility study suggested effects on heart rate variability, but further trials are needed.
- Sensate: A chest-worn device producing infrasonic vibrations, marketed as enhancing vagal tone. Independent peer-reviewed evidence remains limited.

=== Auricular ultrasound VNS ===
- ZenBud (NeurGear): An auricular ultrasound stimulator that applies low-intensity ultrasound to the outer ear. A 2025 peer-reviewed pilot study reported reductions in anxiety-related symptoms, though larger trials are required to establish efficacy.

== Criticisms and considerations ==
While non-invasive vagus nerve stimulation technologies have expanded in consumer markets, many lack robust, independent clinical evidence validating many claims. Most consumer-facing reviews and information sources are financially tied to manufacturers, potentially introducing bias.

Healthcare providers recommend cautious evaluation of claims and consultation with medical professionals before beginning nVNS treatments, particularly for individuals with underlying medical or psychiatric conditions.

== See also ==
- Vagus nerve
- Vagus nerve stimulation
- Cranial electrotherapy stimulation
- Neuromodulation
- Transcutaneous electrical nerve stimulation
