= LivaNova =

Italian-American medical device manufacturer

LivaNova, plc
- Type: Public
- Traded as: Nasdaq: LIVN; S&P 400 Component
- ISIN: GB00BYMT0J19
- Industry: Medical Devices
- Founded: 1987; 39 years ago
- Headquarters: Legal headquarters: 20 Eastbourne Terrace, London; Operational headquarters, North America): 100 Cyberonics Blvd Ste 600, Houston, Texas
- Key people: Vladimir Makatsaria (CEO); Alex Shvartsburg (CFO)
- Products: Medical devices for neuromodulation and cardiac surgery
- Revenue: ▲US$1.39 billion (2025)
- Net income: ▼ −US$242 million (2025)
- Number of employees: 2,900
- Website: www.livanova.com

LivaNova, plc is a medical device manufacturer that is a foreign domiciled company based in the U.K. for tax inversion purposes. With operational headquarters in the United States. The company develops devices used for cardiac surgery and neuromodulation. The company was formed in 2015 by a $2.7B merger between Houston, Texas-based Cyberonics, Inc. and Milan, Italy-based Sorin S.p.a. The company trades on the NASDAQ stock exchange under the ticker symbol "LIVN".

== History ==
In 1956, Sorin Biomedica was founded by Italy's two largest industrial groups at that time: Fiat and Montedison (now under Edison). The name 'Sorin' is an acronym for Società Ricerche Impianti Nucleari (Company for Nuclear Plant Research). Later the company became known as Sorin Group.

In 1987, Cyberonics, Inc. was founded in Houston, United States.

In March 2015, the two companies announced they would be merging in a $2.7B transaction. The transaction closed and the company began trading under the new stock symbol on Oct. 19. 2015. In December 2017, LivaNova announced it would acquire Imthera Medical for approximately $224M.

In 2018, LivaNova sold its cardiac rhythm management business unit to MicroPort for $190M.

In 2020, LivaNova announced the sale of its heart valve (HV) business, which became Corcym.

In May 2022, Livanova announced the acquisition of Pittsburgh based biotechnology company ALung Technologies Inc. LivaNova PLC will acquire the 97% interest in privately held ALung that it doesn’t currently own for the $10 million deal.

In April 2023, CEO Damien McDonald resigned.

On March 1, 2024, Vladimir Makatsaria was appointed LivaNova's new CEO and Board Director.

== Business units ==
The new combined company announced in May 2015 that it was focused on three product categories and will operate as three business units. The three units are: neuromodulation, with its operating HQ in Houston; cardiac surgery, with its operating HQ in Italy; cardiac rhythm management, with its operating HQ in France.

In 2018, the cardiac rhythm management business unit was sold to focus on the remaining two.

In March 2020, LivaNova established Epsy Health, a digital health unit aimed at empowering patients, caregivers and healthcare providers in their journey for the treatment of epilepsy.

In December 2020, LivaNova announced the disposal of its heart valve (HV) business, which would later become Corcym.

LivaNova provides vagus nerve stimulation products.
