= Joshua Prager (doctor) =

American physician of pain medicine

Joshua Philip Prager
- Born: Queens, New York, United States
- Education: Stony Brook University, Harvard University, Stanford University School of Medicine, Stanford Graduate School of Business, Harvard Medical School at the Massachusetts General Hospital, Stanford University Medical Center, UCLA Center for the Health Sciences
- Medical career
- Profession: Physician
- Field: Pain medicine
- Institutions: UCLA Medical Center
- Website: californiapainmedicinecenter.com

Joshua Philip Prager M.D., M.S. is an American physician. Prager specializes in pain medicine and is the executive director of Center for the Rehabilitation Pain Syndromes (CRPS) at UCLA Medical Plaza.

== Early life and education ==
Joshua P. Prager was born in New York City, the son of Julian Arthur Prager (1914–1981) and Eleanor Vernon Goldsmith (maiden; 1917–2008). Joshua is the son of a New York City police officer, and later, a public school mathematics teacher, and a United Cerebral Palsy shelter workshop supervisor. Prager was educated in the New York City public school system

He studied as an undergraduate at Stony Brook University, completed his premedical education, and was a graduate student at Harvard University. Prager graduated from Stanford University with M.D. and attended Stanford Graduate School of Business receiving an M.S. in Management/Health Services Research in 1981.

Prager financially put himself through college and medical school. He was a Resident Fellow at Stanford running an undergraduate residence.

He completed training in internal medicine at University of California, Los Angeles before completing training in anesthesiology at Massachusetts General Hospital (MGH) at Harvard Medical School and Stanford University School of Medicine.

== Career ==
Prager served on the full-time faculty at MGH at Harvard Medical School and at UCLA School of Medicine where he served as Director of the UCLA Pain Medicine Center. He is Board Certified in Internal Medicine, Anesthesiology and Pain Medicine.

In 2005, Prager was elected as president of the North American Neuromodulation Society, and served two consecutive, one-year terms as president until 2007. Until 2012, he served as Director at Large of the International Neuromodulation Society.

He has served two consecutive 2-year terms as Chair of the Complex Regional Pain Syndrome Group of the International Association for the Study of Pain. He is also the Editor and Chair of the Pain and End-of-Life CME program from the California Society of Anesthesiologists.

Prager is one of the few physicians in the US to perform Dorsal Root Ganglion Stimulation for CRPS.

Prager is a recognized expert who speaks nationally and internationally in the administration of Ketamine for depression, CRPS and other pain problems. In 2016, he was involved in writing guidelines for Ketamine treatment under the aegis of the Reflex Sympathetic Dystrophy Syndrome Association (RSDSA). Dr. Prager is also a member of the board of directors for the RSDSA.

He is a member of the Board of Directors of the International Research Consortium for CRPS |url=https://www.crpsconsortium.org/about/ |access-date=2026-07-27 |website=crpsconsortium.org |language=en-US}}</ref>

He has been interviewed on ABC News, CBS News, The Doctors, Lifestyle Magazine, LA Times, National Public Radio, and Medscape.

== Public service ==
In 2005, he organized the first meeting of a coalition of pain organizations and all three manufacturers of spinal cord stimulator systems to collaborate on issues of patient access and reimbursement for neuromodulatory procedures. The same year, Prager joined the Medical Evidence Evaluation Advisory Committee (MEEAC), a group appointed by the Governor of California to develop treatment guidelines for medical care of the injured worker. He continued in the role for six years.

He is a Medical Expert for the Medical Board of California, the California Attorney General and the District Attorney of the County of Los Angeles, and the City Attorney of the City of Santa Monica.

He helped establish or reorganize several inner-city health centers and provided volunteer internal medicine care at Haight Ashbury Free Clinics. He also provided volunteer anesthesia for children in the developing world who need corrective surgeries for congenital anomalies.

He serves as the volunteer director of pain management and as a volunteer physician for Veterans in Pain (VIP).

== Personal life ==
Prager plays blues harmonica under the pseudonym Dr. Lester "Les" Payne. He has played with the late James Govan in Memphis, as well as with Jimmy Burns in Chicago. He lives in Los Angeles and has three children.

== Awards and distinctions ==
- Bounty of Hope Award, Reflex Sympathetic Dystrophy Society of America (RSDSA) for Patient Care and contributions to the RSD community. (2007)
- Decade of Pain Lecture, American Academy of Pain Medicine. (2007)
- Texas Pain Society, Samuel Hassenbusch Lecture. (October 2009)
- Lifetime Achievement Award, Presented at the 16th Annual Meeting of the North American Neuromodulation Society (December 2012)
- Distinguished Service Award, Presented at the 22nd Annual Meeting of the North American Neuromodulation Society (October 2018)

== Select articles ==
- Prager JP (2010). "What does the mechanism of spinal cord stimulation tell us about complex regional pain syndrome". Pain Med. 11 (8): 1278–1283. doi:10.1111/j.1526-4637.2010.00915.x. PMID 20704677.
- Prager JP (2002). "Neuraxial Medication Delivery: The Development and Maturity of a Concept for Treating Chronic Pain of Spinal Origin". Spine. 27 (22): 2593–2605. doi:10.1097/00007632-200211150-00037. PMID 12435999. S2CID 30191791.
- Prager J, Deer, T, Levy R, Bruel B, Buchser E, Caraway D, Cousins M, Jacobs M, McGlothlen G, Rauck R, Staats P, Stearns L (2014). "Best practices for Intrathecal Drug Delivery for Pain". Neuromodulation. 17 (4): 354–372. doi:10.1111/ner.12146. PMID 24446870. S2CID 25935175.
- Connolly SB, Prager JP, Harden RN (2015). "A Systematic Review of Ketamine for Complex Regional Pain Syndrome". Pain Medicine. 16 (5): 943–969. doi:10.1111/pme.12675. PMID 25586192.
- O'Brien SL, Pangarkar S, Prager JP (2014). "The Use of Ketamine in Neuropathic Pain". Current Physical Medicine and Rehabilitation Reports. 2 (5): 128–145. doi:10.1007/s40141-014-0045-2. S2CID 39466500.
- Deer TR, Prager J, Levy R, Rathmell J, Buchser E, Burton A, Caraway D, Cousins M, De Andrés J, Diwan S, Erdek M, Grigsby E, Huntoon M, Jacobs MS, Kim P, Kumar K, Leong M, Liem L, McDowell GC, Panchal S, Rauck R, Saulino M, Sitzman BT, Staats P, Stanton-Hicks M, Stearns L, Wallace M, Willis KD, Witt W, Yaksh T, Mekhail N (2012). "Polyanalgesic Consensus Conference 2012: Recommendations for the Management of Pain by Intrathecal (Intraspinal) Drug Delivery: Report of an Interdisciplinary Expert Panel". Neuromodulation. 15 (5): 436–466. doi:10.1111/j.1525-1403.2012.00476.x. PMID 22748024. S2CID 10011197.
- Prager J, Deer T, Levy R, Bruel B, Buchser E, Caraway D, Cousins M, Jacobs M, McGlothlen G, Rauck R, Staats P (2014). "Best practices for intrathecal drug delivery for pain". Neuromodulation. 15 (5): 354–372. doi:10.1111/ner.12146. PMID 24446870. S2CID 25935175.
