= Peter Staats =

American physician

Peter Sean Staats
- Education: University of California Santa Barbara; University of Michigan Medical School; Johns Hopkins University
- Occupations: Physician, Educator

Peter Sean Staats is an American physician, specializing in interventional pain medicine. He is the founder of the Division of Pain Medicine at the Johns Hopkins School of Medicine, and was the Division's chief for nearly a decade. He is a past president of the North American Neuromodulation Society, the New Jersey Society of Interventional Pain Medicine, the American Society of Interventional Pain Physicians (ASIPP) the World Institute of Pain (WIP), The Southern Pain Society.

He is the author of over five hundred articles, abstracts and book chapters regarding pain management and neuromodulation. He has written or co-edited 14 books on the science and clinical practice of interventional pain medicine. He has written a broad theory of pain with Arthur Staats and Hamid Hekmat that unifies the biology with the psychologic aspects of pain.

== Early life and education ==
Staats is the son of Arthur W. Staats and Carolyn K Staats. Staats' father was a behavioral psychologist who invented Time Out for early child development and was known for developing a field of psychology termed Psychological Behaviorism. He attended Punahou School in Hawaii from first grade to 12th grade.

Staats attended the University of California at Santa Barbara and studied Physiologic psychology (neuroscience) and biological sciences.

Staats entered the University of Michigan medical school in 1985 and graduated in 1989. He was accepted for a one-year transitional program at the University of Hawaii (1989) and later in anesthesia and critical care medicine at Johns Hopkins University in Baltimore (1993). At the conclusion of his residency program at Johns Hopkins he did a fellowship in pain Medicine. He completed an MBA in Healthcare services at Johns Hopkins University Carey school of business in 2004.

== Early career ==
After completion of a residency and fellowship in pain medicine he developed the Johns Hopkins division of pain medicine in the department of anesthesia and critical care. At age 30 was made division chief making him the youngest division chief at Johns Hopkisn school of medicine. He wrote Psychological Behaviorism theory of Pain with his father Arthur and Hamid Hekmat PhD. This approach unified the biological with psychological perspectives in pain and served as a foundation for multidisciplinary and interventional pain used in many pain clinics today. Early research was on mechanisms of placebo effects and intrathecal therapy for cancer related pain. Other research was on high dose topical capsaicin, creating the foundational patents for Qutenza patch. He has trained numerous fellows residents and Medical students from Johns Hopkins University in interventional pain and placed a highlight on the lack of education on appropriate pain care. He developed an interventional pain track for Anesthesiology including implantation of neuromodulation devices and was the first academic anesthesiologist to have surgical privileges at any academic university in the United States.

=== Leadership in academic societies ===
- Founding chair: Interventional pain section American Society of Anesthesiologists 1996
- President Southern Pain Society 2002–2004
- President North American Neuromodulation Society 2002-2003
- President NJ society of Interventional pain 2014–2015
- President American Society of Interventional Pain 2015–2016
- Chair Board of Examination World Institute of Pain 2015–2019
- Health and Human Services United States Government Subcommittee one alternatives to opioid therapy, pain task force June 18, 2018 -June 2019
- President elect World Institute of Pain 2019-2020
- President World Institute of Pain 2020–2023
- Founder and Chair Vagus Nerve Society 2022–present

== Industry ==
In 2004 he co-founded Premier Pain Centers and served as co managing partner until 2016 when it merged with National Spine and Pain Centers to become the largest integrated network of pain practices in the United States. He has served as the chief medical officer between 2017 and 2023. He is also a Co Founder of electroCore in 2005, which has developed non invasive vagus nerve stimulation for a variety of indications. CE Mark in Europe includes treatment of bronchoconstriction, Primary headache, gastrointestinal disorders, treatment of anxiety and seizure disorders. In the US, the FDA has granted six clearances in headache for acute treatment of episodic cluster, prevention of cluster headache, acute treatment of migraine, prevention of migraine, the treatment of adolescent migraine, the treatment of hemicrania continua and the treatment of paroxysmal hemicrania. Emergency use application application for vagus nerve stimulation for treatment of COVID related respiratory distress was granted in 2020. Breakthrough designation for PTSD from the FDA was granted in 2022.

== Awards and honors ==
- Recipient of “President's Distinguished Service Award,” Southern Pain Society, March 2000
- Hugh and Renee Rosomoff Award for Rxcellence in Pain Management 2004
- Named in America's Top Doctors, May 2001 - 2019
- Named Outstanding Pain Physician of the Year by New York and New Jersey Chapters of the American Society of Interventional Pain Physicians, October 2012.
- Recipient of “Clinical Excellence Award”, Pain 2013 Conference, presented by the West Virginia Society of Interventional Pain Physicians, July 2013
- Recipient ASIPP Raj Award for Excellence ( ASIPP annual meeting 2017)
- Lifetime Achievement award American Society of Interventional Pain Physicians (ASIPP) March 2018
- Lifetime Achievement Award West Virginia Society of interventional pain, American society of pain and neuroscience June 1, 2018
- Lifetime Achievement Award New York and New Jersey Societies of Interventional Pain November 2018
- Lifetime Achievement Award North American Neuromodulation Society Las Vegas (Jan 2019)
- Lifetime Achievement Award American Society of Pain and Neuroscience (2021)
- Legacy Award The 30th Annual Napa Pain Conference ( Aug 2023)
- Trailblazer award The World institute of Pain (Sept 2023)
