= Vagus nerve stimulation =

Medical treatment that involves delivering electrical impulses to the vagus nerve

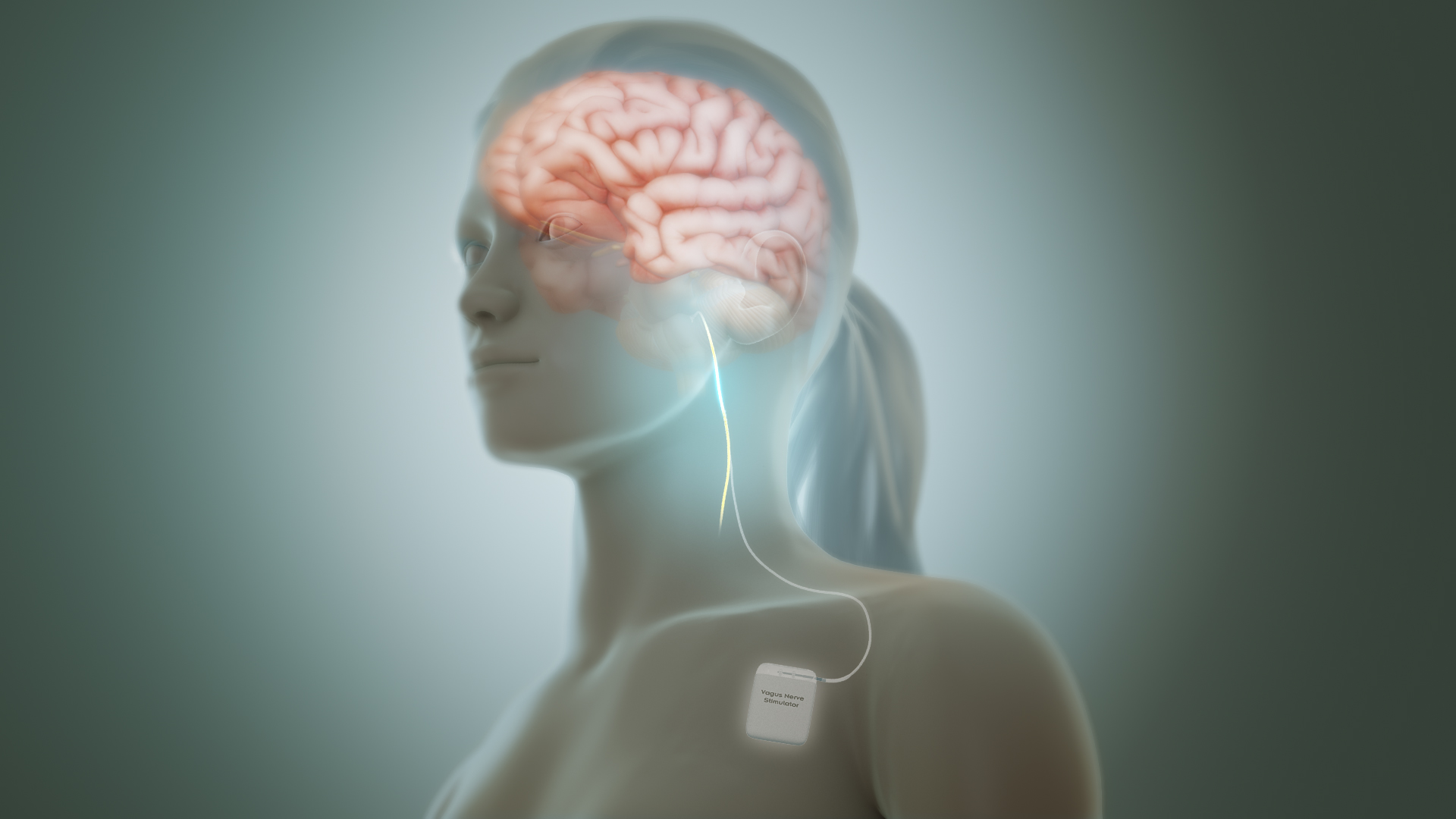
- Electrical stimulation of vagus nerve.
- Other names: Vagal nerve stimulation

Vagus nerve stimulation (VNS) is a medical treatment that involves delivering electrical impulses to the vagus nerve. Initially developed by James Leonard Corning to compress or stimulate the carotid sheath, VNS typically refers to an implantable electrode. However, non-invasive VNS delivered transcutaneously via the auricular branch of the vagus nerve, or through the skin to the cervical nerve, is being investigated in clinical research. Invasive VNS is used as an adjunct treatment for certain types of intractable epilepsy, cluster headaches, migraine, treatment-resistant depression and stroke rehabilitation.

== Medical use ==
=== Epilepsy ===
VNS is used to treat drug-resistant epilepsy. For refractive epilepsy, cervical VNS on the left side is FDA-approved.

In the United States, VNS is approved as adjunctive therapy for those 4 years of age or older with refractory focal onset seizures. In the European Union, VNS is approved as an adjunctive therapy for patients with either generalized or focal onset seizures without any age restrictions. It is recommended that VNS is only pursued following an adequate trial of at least 2 appropriately chosen anti-seizure medications and that the patient is ineligible for epilepsy surgery. This is because epilepsy surgery is associated with a higher probability of resulting in seizure freedom. Patients who have poor adherence or tolerance of anti-seizure medications may be good candidates for VNS.

VNS may provide benefit for particular epilepsy syndromes and seizure types such as Lennox-Gastaut syndrome, tuberous sclerosis complex related epilepsy, refractory absence seizures, and atonic seizures. There are also reports of VNS being successfully utilized in patients with refractory and super-refractory status epilepticus. Several clinical studies, including a long-term retrospective review published in 2020, have reported that VNS can reduce seizure frequency in patients with drug-resistant epilepsy associated with structural brain lesions.

=== Cluster headaches and migraine ===
The UK National Institute for Health and Care Excellence (NICE) in the UK recommends VNS for cluster headaches. In 2017 the FDA approved the non-invasive gammaCore VNS system for treatment of episodic cluster headache and expanded its approved usage to acute treatment of pain associated with migraine. Two randomized, double-blind, and sham-controlled studies have administered nVNS to patients with episodic cluster headaches; both demonstrated a significant effect in reducing acute cluster attacks.

=== Treatment-resistant depression ===
VNS is used to treat treatment-resistant major depressive disorder (TR-MDD). For treatment resistant depression, cervical VNS on the left side is FDA-approved. The UK NICE guidance (from 2020) stated that "Evidence on its efficacy is limited in quality" and encouraged further research studies "in the form of randomised controlled trials with a placebo or sham stimulation arm."

=== Chronic pain ===
VNS has been used to treat chronic pain due to various causes, although the mechanisms for this relief have yet to be determined.

=== Heart failure ===
VNS has shown to be of value in the treatment of heart failure. One study did not show a reduction in death rates, but did show improvement in six-minute hall walk duration and quality of life.

=== Atrial fibrillation ===
Animal studies have shown the capacity of low-level VNS to reduce inducibility of atrial fibrillation. This effect has been proposed to be due to inhibition of the ganglionated plexi.

=== Stroke treatment and rehabilitation ===
VNS can be used either invasively or non-invasively to treat ischemic stroke. Invasive VNS can only be applied invasively (by surgery), but non-invasive VNS can be used in acute settings.

In 2021, the U.S. Food and Drug Administration approved the MicroTransponder Vivistim Paired VNS System (Vivistim System) to treat moderate to severe upper extremity motor deficits associated with chronic ischemic stroke.

== Efficacy ==
=== Epilepsy ===
A meta-analysis of 74 clinical studies with 3321 patients found that VNS produced an average 51% reduction in seizures after 1 year of therapy. Approximately 50% of patients had an equal to or greater than 50% reduction in seizures at the time of last follow-up. Long-term studies have shown that response to VNS increases over time. For instance, a study that followed 74 patients for 10–17 years found a seizure frequency reduction of 50-90% in 38.4%, 51.4%, 63.6% and 77.8% of patients at 1-, 2-, 10- and 17-years following implantation, respectively. Approximately, 8% have total resolution of seizures. VNS has also been shown to reduce rates of sudden unexpected death in epilepsy (SUDEP) and to improve quality of life metrics. A number of predictors of a favorable clinical response have been identified including epilepsy onset > 12 years of age, generalized epilepsy type, non-lesional epilepsy, posttraumatic epilepsy and those who have less than a 10-year history of seizures.

Long-term cognitive outcomes are at least stable following VNS.

One study of children with epilepsy found that a post hoc analysis revealed a dose–response correlation for VNS.

=== Depression ===
A 2022 narrative review concluded that VNS is an effective and well-tolerated therapy for chronic and treatment-resistant depression. Importantly, the review also noted that the therapeutic effect of VNS in this context may take 3–12 months to materialize but may be persistent long-term. One study of only 10 weeks found no effect.

A 2020 review concluded "Reviewed studies strongly suggest that VNS ameliorates depressive symptoms in drug-resistant epileptic patients and that the VNS effect on depression is uncorrelated to seizure response.

In one study higher electrical dose parameters were associated with response durability.

=== Well-being ===
VNS may have positive well-being, mood and quality of life effects.

Studies have found improvements in standard patient-reported mood assessment scales in adult patients with epilepsy after using VNS, and some have found no association between mood change and reduction in seizure frequency. Another study of epilepsy patients measured a general mood improvement, and suggested that VNS may improve unspecific states of indisposition and dysphoria. Patients with comorbid depression have been found to have mood improvements with VNS therapy.

Quality of life (QOL) improvement was also associated with VNS use. One study of children with epilepsy found that better quality of life outcomes after VNS implantation were strongly associated with shorter duration of preoperative seizures and implantation at a young age.

=== Heart diseases ===
In cardiac arrest VNS used in conjunction with cardiopulmonary resuscitation (CPR) has been shown to increase recovery time (return of spontaneous circulation) as well as reduce the number of shocks required when used in conjunction with cardioversion. Numerous pre-clinical studies have shown the effectiveness of VNS in reducing atrial fibrillation and hypertension.

=== COVID-19 ===
In 2020 during the COVID-19 pandemic, the gammaCore Sapphire CV non-invasive VNS system was granted emergency use authorization for suspected COVID-19 patients experiencing "asthma-related dyspnea and reduced airflow, and for whom approved drug therapies are not tolerated or provide insufficient symptom relief." Clinical trials show VNS reduces inflammation in COVID patients. In patients with long COVID, VNS is efficacious in reducing inflammatory markers and chronic fatigue.

=== Other possible efficacy areas ===
Very small studies have shown possible efficacy of VNS for reduction of Sjogren's fatigue, and for inflammatory bowel disease.

Piezoelectric BaTiO_{3} particles conjugated with capsaicin were designed as orally ingested electrostimulators to activate the vagus nerves to combat obesity. This intervention has not yet been tested on the human body.

== Mechanisms of action ==
The causes of VNS efficacy are not well understood.

Mechanisms which may account for the efficacy of VNS include:

=== Cortical desynchronization ===
There is evidence that VNS results in cortical desynchronization in epilepsy patients who had a favorable clinical response relative to those who did not. This makes sense given that seizures consist of abnormal hypersynchronous activity in the brain.

=== Reducing inflammation ===
Multiple lines of evidence suggest that inflammation plays a significant role in epilepsy as well as associated neurobehavioral comorbidities such as depression, autism spectrum disorder and cognitive impairment. There is evidence that VNS has an anti-inflammatory effect through both peripheral and central mechanisms.

=== Changing neurotransmitter activity ===
VNS can change the activity of several neurotransmitter systems involving serotonin, norepinephrine, acetylcholine, dopamine, and GABA. The vagus nerve has projects reaching directly in the nucleus of the solitary tract and affects a range of subcortical structures including the locus coeruleus, which serves as the primary source of cortical noradrenaline in the brain. Stimulation of the vagus nerve in rats has been shown to consistently elevate cortical noradrenaline levels in both the short and long-term. Chronic stimulation of the vagus nerve has also been noted to increase serotonin release and firing in the dorsal raphe nuclei. Other studies in rats have also demonstrated a VNS-dependent increase in dopamine concentrations within the prefrontal cortex and nucleus accumbens.

=== Impacting the gut-brain axis ===
VNS influences the vagus nerve, which plays a role in the gut-brain axis. Research has shown that VNS has an anti-inflammatory effect in patients with irritable bowel syndrome. VNS has been shown to reduce cytokine production as well as modulate gut permeability in patients prior to severe burn injuries. Additionally, VNS has been shown to restore dysbiosis in IBD.

=== Indirect stimulation of brain structures ===
Some believe that indirect stimulation of the thalamus may be a key mechanism in VNS efficacy.

== Adverse events ==
=== Adverse events related to the surgical procedure ===
A large 25-year retrospective study of 247 patients found a surgical complication rate of 8.6%. The common adverse events included infection in 2.6%, hematoma at the surgical site in 1.9% and vocal cord palsy in 1.4%.

In some rare cases where the VNS is not effective, surgery may be necessary to remove the VNS system. The surgery may remove both the generator and the lead.

=== Side effects of VNS ===
The most common stimulation related side effect at 1 year following implantation are hoarseness in 28% and paraesthesias in the throat-chin region in 12%. At the third year the rate of stimulation related adverse effects decreased substantially with shortness of breath being the most common and occurring in 3.2%. In general, VNS is well tolerated and side effects diminish over time. Also, side effects can be controlled by changing the stimulation parameters.

One small study found sleep apnea in as many as 28% of adults with epilepsy treated with VNS.

Another small study found significant daytime drowsiness, which could be relieved by reducing the stimulation intensity.

Because vagal tone can reduce heart rate, VNS carries the risk of bradycardia (excessively slow heart rate) and even of stopping the heart.

A range of side effects are possible but rare.

== Devices and procedures ==
=== Intravenous devices ===
The device consists of a generator the size of a matchbox that is implanted under the skin below the person's collarbone. Lead wires from the generator are tunnelled up to the patient's neck and wrapped around the left vagus nerve at the carotid sheath, where it delivers electrical impulses to the nerve.

Implantation of the VNS device is usually done as an out-patient procedure. The procedure goes as follows: an incision is made in the upper left chest and the generator is implanted into a little "pouch" on the left chest under the collarbone. A second incision is made in the neck, so that the surgeon can access the vagus nerve. The surgeon then wraps the leads around the left branch of the vagus nerve, and connects the electrodes to the generator. Once successfully implanted, the generator sends electric impulses to the vagus nerve at regular intervals. The left vagus nerve is stimulated rather than the right because the right plays a role in cardiac function such that stimulating it could have negative cardiac effects. The "dose" administered by the device then needs to be set, which is done via a magnetic wand; the parameters adjusted include current, frequency, pulse width, and duty cycle.

==== Example of stimulation metrics ====
The intravenous VNS system produced by LivaNova has stated default settings for use in depression of output power 1.25mA, frequency 20 Hz and pulse width 250 μs, with operation occurring for 30 seconds every 5 minutes (giving a work cycle of 10%). The non-invasive gammaCore device delivers 5000 Hz pulses at a frequency of 25 Hz at an intensity of up to 60mA or 30V. Stimulations may be administered for up to two minutes in one sitting, and a maximum of 30 stimulations can be delivered over a 24h period.

=== External devices ===
External devices work by transcutaneous stimulation and do not require surgery. Electrical impulses are targeted at the cervical branch of the vagus nerve in the neck, or aurical (ear), at points where branches of the vagus nerve have cutaneous representation. Auricular VNS should be located at the concha or inner tragus.

The GammaCore transcutaneous cervical VNS system is recommended by The National Institute for Health and Care Excellence (NICE) for cluster headaches.

== History ==
=== 1880s - proposed use to reduce cerebral blood flow ===
James L. Corning (1855–1923) was an American neurologist who developed the first device for stimulating the vagus nerve towards the end of the 19th century.

At this time a widely held theory was that excessive blood flow caused seizures.

In the 1880s Corning designed a pronged instrument called the "carotid fork" to compress the carotid artery for the acute treatment of seizures. In addition, he developed the "carotid truss" for prolonged compression of the carotid arteries as a long-term preventative treatment for epilepsy. Then he developed the "electrocompressor" which allowed for the compression of the bilateral carotid arteries as well as electrical stimulation of both the vagus and cervical sympathetic nerves. The idea was to reduce cardiac output and to stimulate cervical sympathetic nerves to constrict cerebral blood vessels. Corning reported dramatic benefits however it was not accepted by his colleagues and ultimately was forgotten.

=== 1930s - research on effects on central nervous system ===
In the 1930s Biley and Bremer demonstrated the direct influence of VNS on the central nervous system. In the 1940s and 1950s vagal nerve stimulation was shown to affect EEG activity.

=== 1980s - use for epilepsy ===
In 1985 neuroscientist Jacob Zabara proposed that VNS could be used to treat epilepsy. He then demonstrated its efficacy in animal experiments. The first human was implanted with a VNS for the treatment of epilepsy in 1988.

=== 1997 onwards - approved medical uses ===
In 1997, the US Food and Drug Administration's neurological devices panel met to consider approval of an implanted vagus nerve stimulator (VNS) for epilepsy, requested by Cyberonics (which was subsequently acquired by LivaNova).

The FDA approved an implanted VNS for TR-MDD in 2005.

In April 2017, the FDA cleared marketing of a handheld noninvasive vagus nerve stimulator, called "gammaCore" and made by ElectroCore LLC, for episodic cluster headaches, under the de novo pathway. In January 2018, the FDA cleared a new use of that device, for the treatment of migraine pain in adults under a 510(k) based on the de novo clearance.

In 2020, electroCore's non-invasive VNS was granted an Emergency Use Authorization for treating COVID-19 patients, given research indicating VNS causes an opening of end terminals in the airways and an anti-inflammatory effect.

In 2021, the same gammaCore nVNS device received Section 510(k) clearance from the FDA to expand its usage for patients with two forms of trigeminal autonomic cephalagia--hemicrania continua and paroxysmal hemicrania.

== Research areas ==
Because the vagus nerve is associated with many different functions and brain regions, clinical research has been done to determine its usefulness in treating many illnesses. These include various anxiety disorders, obesity, alcohol addiction, chronic heart failure, prevention of arrhythmias that can cause sudden cardiac death, autoimmune disorders, irritable bowel syndrome, Alzheimer's disease, Parkinson's disease, hypertension, several chronic pain conditions, inflammatory disorders, fibromyalgia and migraines.

A 2022 study showed that chronic VNS showed strong antidepressant and anxiolytic effects, and improved memory performance in an Alzheimer's Disease animal model.

== See also ==
- Cranial electrotherapy stimulation
- Deep brain stimulation
- Electrical brain stimulation
- Electrotherapy
- Low field magnetic stimulation
- Non-invasive vagus nerve stimulation devices
- Transcranial magnetic stimulation
