= John C. Oakley =

American neurosurgeon (1946–2006)

John C. Oakley (January 11, 1946 – April 17, 2006) was an American neurosurgeon. He was a pioneer in advancing spinal cord stimulator for the treatment of intractable pain.
