= Cranial electrotherapy stimulation =

Form of neurostimulation

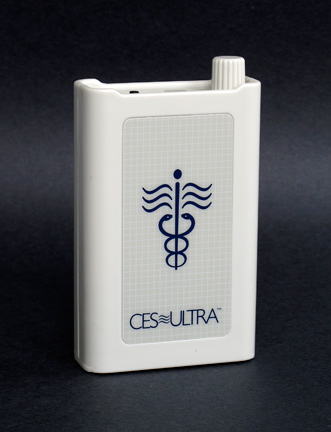
Device used to perform CES

Cranial electrotherapy stimulation (CES) is a form of neurostimulation that delivers a small, pulsed, alternating current via electrodes on the head. CES is used with the intention of treating a variety of conditions such as anxiety, depression and insomnia. CES has been suggested as a possible treatment for headaches, fibromyalgia, smoking cessation, and opiate withdrawal, but there is little evidence of effectiveness for many of these conditions and the evidence for use in acute depression is not sufficient to justify it.

== Medical uses ==
A 2014 Cochrane review found insufficient evidence to determine whether or not CES with alternating current is safe and effective for treating depression. The FDA came to the same conclusion in December 2019.

A 2018 systematic review found that evidence is insufficient that CES has clinically important effects on fibromyalgia, headache, neuromusculoskeletal pain, degenerative joint pain, depression, or insomnia; low-strength evidence suggests modest benefit in patients with anxiety and depression.

== Description ==
Electrodes are placed on the earlobes, maxilla-occipital junction, mastoid processes or temples.

Despite the long history of CES, its underlying principles and mechanisms are still not clear.

CES stimulation of 1 mA (milliampere) has shown to reach the thalamic area at a radius of 13.30 mm. CES has shown to induce changes in the electroencephalogram, increasing alpha relative power and decreasing relative power in delta and beta frequencies.

CES has also shown to reach cortical and subcortical areas of the brain, in electromagnetic tomography and functional MRI studies. CES treatments have been found to induce changes in neurohormones and neurotransmitters that have been implicated in psychiatric disorders: substantial increases in beta endorphins, adrenocorticotrophic hormone, and serotonin; moderate increases in melatonin and norepinephrine, modest or unquantified increases in cholinesterase, gamma-aminobutyric acid, and dehydroepiandrosterone, and moderate reductions in cortisol.

== History ==
Low intensity electrical stimulation is believed to have originated in the studies of galvanic currents in humans and animals as conducted by Giovanni Aldini, Alessandro Volta and others in the 18th century. Aldini had experimented with galvanic head current as early as 1794 (upon himself) and reported the successful treatment of patients with melancholia using direct low-intensity currents in 1804.

CES was initially studied for insomnia and called electrosleep therapy; it is also known as cranial-electro stimulation and transcranial electrotherapy.

Due to the rise of pharmaceutical treatments for depression, anxiety and insomnia, such as Prozac in the 1980s and Ambien in the 1990s, CES was not a well-known treatment for doctors and patients. During the mid-2000s, the combination of pharmaceutical brands becoming generic and Internet advertising caused CES devices to gain popularity. In 2011, the devices received media attention from the Wall Street Journal.

== Regulation ==
In the United States, CES technology is classified by the Food and Drug Administration (FDA) as a Class III medical device and must be dispensed by or on the order of a licensed healthcare practitioner, i.e., a physician, psychiatrist, nurse practitioner, psychologist, physician assistant, or occupational therapist who has an appropriate electrotherapy license, dependent upon state regulations. The United States requires a prescription for CES devices from a licensed healthcare practitioner. The FDA says that there are 11 CES devices cleared for marketing in the United States.

In June 2014, the FDA announced that it "has determined that there is sufficient information to establish special controls, and that these special controls, together with general controls, will provide a reasonable assurance of safety and effectiveness for CES devices. In this action, FDA is withdrawing the proposed rule and proposed order to call for PMAs [premarket approvals] for CES devices. FDA plans to issue a proposed order in the future for the reclassification of the CES device into class II."

In December 2019, the FDA announced that there is no valid evidence for CES as a treatment for depression, and request new trials to be made. "FDA concluded that the four studies published after January 1, 2016, through November 1, 2019, did not contribute sufficient information in the form of valid scientific evidence to demonstrate that the subjects met the criteria for any recognized depressive disorder, as defined in DSM-5"

== See also ==
- Electroconvulsive therapy
- Fisher Wallace Laboratories, markets a CES device
- Neuromodulation
- Neurostimulation
- Neurotechnology
- Transcranial direct-current stimulation
- Transcranial magnetic stimulation
- Vagus Nerve Stimulation Device
