= International Neuromodulation Society =

The International Neuromodulation Society (INS) is a non-profit group of clinicians, scientists and engineers dedicated to the scientific development and awareness of neuromodulation – the alteration of nerve activity through the delivery of electromagnetic stimulation or chemical agents to targeted sites of the body. Neuromodulation is a burgeoning field – analysts forecast a double-digit annual growth rate through 2026. Founded in 1989 and based in San Francisco, CA, the INS educates and promotes the field through meetings, its bimonthly, peer-reviewed journal Neuromodulation: Technology at the Neural Interface and chapter websites.

Neuromodulation: Technology at the Neural Interface is the official publication of the INS. The peer-reviewed journal aims to advance the basic and clinical science of the field of neuromodulation. Published 8 times per year, the journal is MEDLINE-indexed.

== History ==
In 1989, after the first International Congress on Epidural Spinal Cord Stimulation was held in the Netherlands, a group of physicians founded the INS in Paris, France. Their incentive was to bridge the gap between neurologists, neurosurgeons, vascular surgeons and cardiologists to build a multidisciplinary and international society dedicated to the advancement of neuromodulation.

== Today ==
The International Neuromodulation Society now represents a professional association of more than 1700 members worldwide and has a presence in 33 countries around the globe. The INS was named the 2007 Most Valuable Nonprofit Society by Neurotech Reports and was awarded the Golden Electrode Award at the 2007 Neurotech Leaders Forum.

INS members actively work to inform peers and patients about this new class of therapies through organizational collaboration, articles, professional presentations, and web content.

== Regional chapters ==
=== Chapter societies worldwide ===
- Argentinean Neuromodulation Society (SANE)
- Neuromodulation Society of Australia and New Zealand
- Benelux Neuromodulation Society
- Brazilian Neuromodulation Society
- Canadian Neuromodulation Society
- Chinese Neuromodulation Society
- French Neuromodulation Society
- German Neuromodulation Society
- The Neuromodulation Society of India
- Italian Neuromodulation Society
- Japan Neuromodulation Society
- Korean Neuromodulation Society
- Nordic Neuromodulation Society
- North American Neuromodulation Society
- Polish Neuromodulation Society
- Southeast European Neuromodulation Society
- Spanish Neuromodulation Society
- Swiss Neuromodulation Society
- Turkish Neuromodulation Society
- The Neuromodulation Society of the United Kingdom and Ireland

== Biennial congress ==
The 15th World Congress of the INS will be held in Barcelona, Spain in 2022.

== Official journal ==
The official journal of the International Neuromodulation Society is Neuromodulation: Technology at the Neural Interface.

== Timeline ==
- 1992: The first scientific meeting of the INS was held in Rome, Italy.
- 1995: The North American Neuromodulation Society (NANS), the first chapter of the INS, was founded.
- 1998: The INS' journal, Neuromodulation, was first published.
- 1999: The Italian Neuromodulation Society was founded.
- 2001: The Neuromodulation Society of the United Kingdom & Ireland (NSUKI) was founded.
- 2002: The Benelux Neuromodulation Society was founded.
- 2004: The Australian Neuromodulation Society was formed.
- 2005: The German, Japan and Southeast European Neuromodulation Societies were founded.
- 2006: The North American Neuromodulation Society hosted its 10th annual meeting.
- 2007: The Spanish Neuromodulation Society was formed. In addition, five new national chapters joined the INS: Brazil, Canada, China, France and Korea.
- 2008: The INS announced it represents a professional association of more than 1200 members worldwide.
- 2009: The Argentinean Neuromodulation Society (SANE) was founded.

== See also ==
- Neuromodulation
- Neurostimulation
- Neurotechnology
- Neurotherapy
- Non-invasive cerebellar stimulation
