= Journal of Hand Surgery (American Volume) =

Peer-reviewed medical journal

- Discipline: Surgery
- Language: English
- Edited by: Brent Graham

Publication details
- Publisher: Elsevier (United States of America)
- Impact factor: 2.09 (2018)

Standard abbreviations
- ISO 4: J. Hand Surg. (Am. Vol.)
- NLM: J Hand Surg Am

Indexing
- ISSN: 0363-5023 (print); 1531-6564 (web)
- OCLC no.: 868230532

Links
- Journal homepage; Elsevier journal page

The Journal of Hand Surgery (American Volume) is a peer-reviewed medical journal that addresses the "diagnosis, treatment, and pathophysiology of diseases and conditions of the upper extremity." The editor-in-chief is Brent Graham. It is published by Elsevier on behalf of the American Society for Surgery of the Hand.

== Abstracting and indexing ==
The journal is abstracted and indexed in Scopus and the Science Citation Index Expanded. According to the Journal Citation Reports, its 2018 impact factor is 2.09.
