= Neuromodulation (journal) =

- Discipline: Neuromodulation
- Language: English
- Edited by: Robert M. Levy

Publication details
- History: 1998-present
- Publisher: Elsevier on behalf of the International Neuromodulation Society
- Frequency: 8/year
- Open access: Hybrid
- Impact factor: 4.029 (2019)

Standard abbreviations
- ISO 4: Neuromodulation

Indexing
- ISSN: 1094-7159 (print); 1525-1403 (web)
- OCLC no.: 41390172

Links
- Journal homepage; Online access; Online archive

Neuromodulation: Technology at the Neural Interface is a peer-reviewed medical journal covering clinical, translational, and basic science research in the field of neuromodulation. It was established in 1998 by founding editor Elliot S. Krames and is published by Elsevier on behalf of the International Neuromodulation Society. The editor-in-chief is Robert M. Levy.

== Abstracting and indexing ==
The journal is abstracted and indexed in:

- Chemical Abstracts Service
- EBSCO databases
- Embase
- Index Medicus/MEDLINE/PubMed
- Neuroscience Citation Index
- Science Citation Index Expanded
- EMBASE/Excerpta Medica

According to Wiley, the publisher until 2022, the journal has a 2019 impact factor of 4.029.
