= Deep brain stimulation =

Neurosurgical treatment

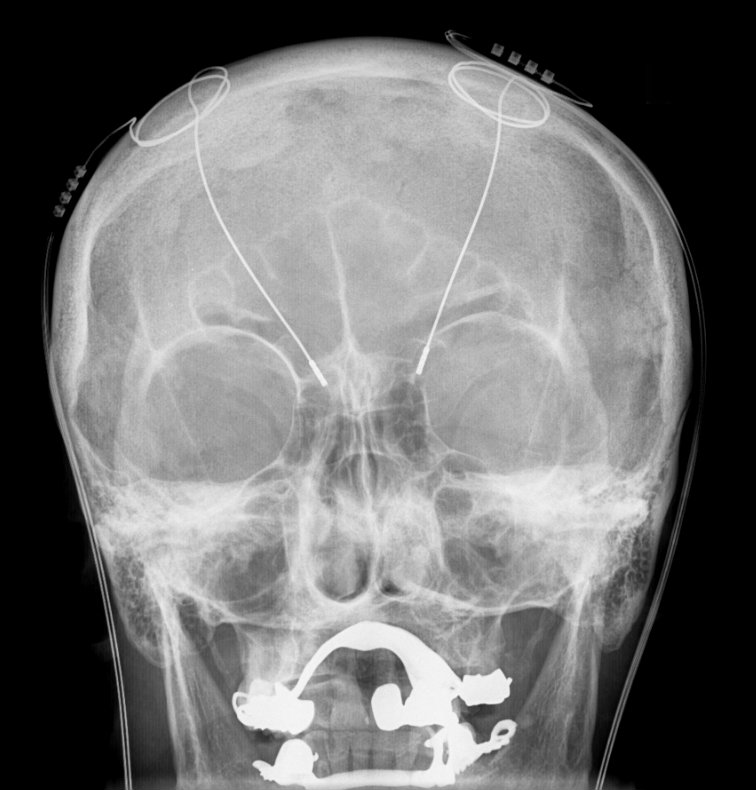
- DBS-probes shown in X-ray of the skull (white areas around maxilla and mandible represent metal dentures and are unrelated to DBS devices)
- Specialty: Neurosurgery
- ICD-10-PCS: nij
- MeSH: D046690
- MedlinePlus: 007453

Deep brain stimulation (DBS) is a type of neurostimulation therapy in which an implantable pulse generator is surgically implanted below the skin of the chest and connected by leads to the brain to deliver controlled electrical impulses. These charges therapeutically disrupt and promote dysfunctional nervous system circuits bidirectionally in both ante- and retrograde directions. Though first developed for Parkinsonian tremor, the technology has since been adapted to a wide variety of chronic neurologic disorders.

The exact mechanisms of DBS are complex and not fully understood, though it is thought to mimic the effects of lesioning by disrupting pathologically elevated and oversynchronized informational flow in misfiring brain networks. As opposed to permanent ablation, the effect can be reversed by turning off the DBS device. Common targets include the globus pallidus, ventral nuclear group of the thalamus, internal capsule, and subthalamic nucleus. It is one of the few neurosurgical procedures that allows blinded experiments, although most studies to date have not taken advantage of this discriminant.

Since its introduction in the late 1980s, DBS has become a major research hotspot for surgical treatment of tremor in Parkinson's disease, and the preferred surgical treatment for Parkinson's disease, essential tremor, and dystonia. Its indications have since extended to include obsessive–compulsive disorder, refractory epilepsy, chronic pain, Tourette syndrome, and cluster headache. In the past three decades, more than 244,000 patients worldwide have been implanted with DBS.

DBS has been approved by the Food and Drug Administration in the United States as a treatment for essential and Parkinsonian tremor since 1997 and for Parkinson's disease since 2002. It was approved as a humanitarian device exemption for dystonia in 2003, obsessive–compulsive disorder (OCD) in 2009, and epilepsy in 2018. DBS has been studied in clinical trials as a potential treatment for chronic pain, affective disorders, depression, Alzheimer's disease, and drug addiction, amongst others.

== Device components ==
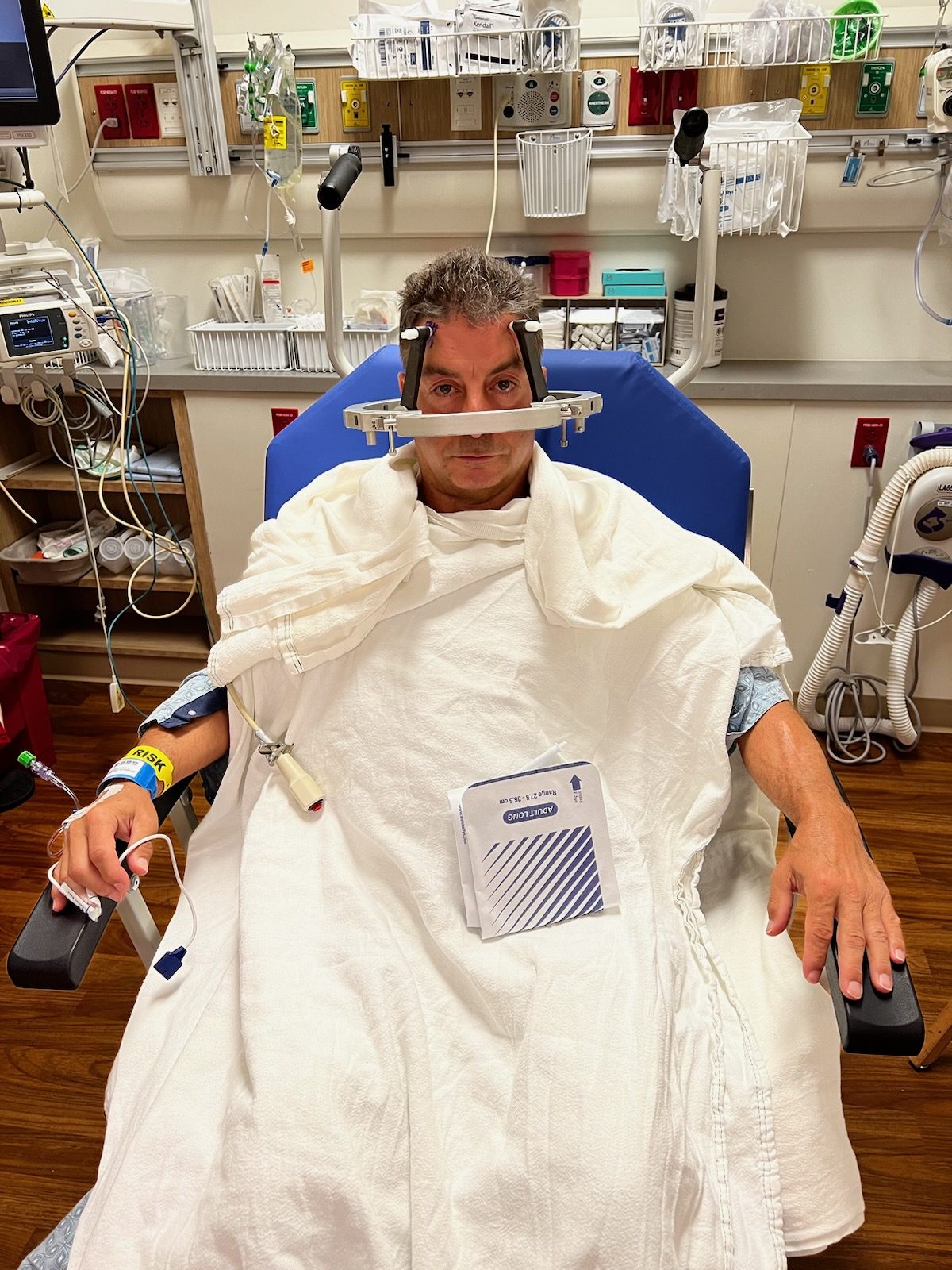
An adult male undergoing pre-operative preparation for deep-brain stimulation

The DBS system consists of three components: a neurostimulator known as an implanted pulse generator (IPG), its leads, and an extension. The neurostimulator comprises a titanium housing and a battery that sends electrical pulses to the brain to interfere with neural activity through deafferentation.

The leads are two coiled wires insulated in polyurethane with four platinum-iridium electrodes that allow delivery of electric charge from the battery pack implanted in the chest wall. The battery is usually situated subcutaneously below the clavicle and rarely in the abdomen. The leads, in turn, are connected to the battery by an insulated extension wire which travels from the chest wall superiorly along the back of the neck below the skin, behind the ear, and finally enters the skull through a surgically made burr hole to terminate in the deep nuclei of the brain. Microelectrodes (usually 1–5) are delivered through the burr holes. A combination of microelectrode recordings, microstimulation, macrostimulation, and neurophysiological mapping at the level of single neurons or local neuronal populations through local field potential analyses are used to increase the specificity of placement for the most precise neurophysiologic effect possible.

After surgery, battery dosage is titrated to individual symptoms, a process that requires repeat visits to a clinician for readjustment.

DBS leads are placed in the brain according to the specific symptoms to be addressed, and implantation may take place under local or general anesthesia. A hole about 14 mm in diameter is drilled in the skull, and the probe electrode is inserted stereotactically, using either frame-based or frameless stereotaxis. During the awake procedure with local anesthesia, feedback from the individual is used to determine the optimal placement of the permanent electrode. During the asleep procedure, intraoperative MRI is used to image the brain during device placement. The installation of the IPG and extension leads occurs under general anesthesia.

== Clinical usage ==
The surgery is utilized in Parkinson's to help with motor symptoms and reduce dopaminergic medication, but it does not usually help with axial non motor symptoms such as posture, gait instability, mechanical falls, and can have adverse effects such as loss of cognitive function, depression, apathy, and suicide.

The selection of the correct individual to have the procedure is a complicated process. Multiple clinical characteristics are taken into account, including identifying the most troubling symptoms, current medications, and comorbidities. Surgery and aftercare are typically managed by multidisciplinary teams at specialized institutions. The right side of the brain is stimulated to address symptoms on the left side of the body and vice versa.

The surgery is usually contraindicated in individuals who have dementia, suffer from depression or other psychiatric disorders, or who have frequent falls despite being in their best on-drug state. Systematic assessment of benign or even beneficial precursor symptoms of a hyperdopaminergic syndrome, such as do-it-yourself activities, creativity, and nocturnal hyperactivity, also helps prevent the devastating behavioral addictions or impulse-control disorders that can occur after the procedure.

Stereotactic MRI is used to localize the target nuclei, though it is more susceptible to anatomic field distortion than ventriculography; the latter is not done anymore as it is considered too invasive for its benefit with anatomic precision and the advent of high Tesla intraoperative MRIs. The awake variant of the surgery allows symptom testing in real time. Several motor symptoms, except gait, can be evaluated; however, wrist rigidity is often done because it does not require the patient's active participation and can be scored in the operating room by use of a semi-quantitative scale. Speech and tremor can also be assessed in real time, though speech may be difficult to evaluate due to fatigue that occurs for the patient during the later hours of the procedure. When the best tract has been identified, the corresponding microelectrode is removed and replaced by a permanent lead. Because of its larger size, the GPi does not necessarily require microrecording prior to placement of a chronic lead, leading to a reduced risk of hemorrhage or cognitive deficit.

Postoperative programming after DBS is complex and personalized, but poorly standardized across institutions despite decades of research. In practice, it is still an iterative trial-and-error-based process. Parameters are initially set based on experience and then adjusted according to individual clinical response. Though this works for symptoms that respond quickly to stimulation, such as tremor, for other symptoms with a more delayed or nuanced response profile, it carries the risk of chronic overstimulation leading to adverse events, including impairment of gait and speech. Inappropriate stimulation can also cause non-motor side effects such as impaired cognition or manic disinhibition. Such effects are usually energy-dependent and reversible with adjustment. Though it is recognized that the most important parameter in stimulation is frequency over voltage or pulse-width, there is no global consensus about the initial parameters of DBS, nor is there a protocol for stimulation options in case of poor outcome.

In distinction to DBS, although surgical lesions in the globus pallidus improve dyskinesias and Parkinsonian symptoms, they are irreversible and carry a risk of permanent neurologic deficit. Similarly, lesions of the STN improve Parkinsonian symptoms, but can cause hemiballism.

=== Parkinson's disease ===
DBS is used to manage Parkinson's disease symptoms that are resistant to medication. The ideal candidate for DBS is one who does not have dementia, is not severely depressed, and who does not have falls while being in their best on-drug state, but who does have disabling motor fluctuations or dyskinesias that necessitate bilateral surgery. It is treated by applying high-frequency (> 100 Hz) stimulation to target structures in the deep subcortical white matter of the basal ganglia. Frequently used targets include the subthalamic nucleus (STN), globus pallidus internus (GPi), and ventrointermediate nucleus of the thalamus (VIM). Neurostimulation can be considered for people who have Parkinson's with motor fluctuations and tremors inadequately controlled by medication, or to those who are intolerant to medication as long as they do not have severe neuropsychiatric problems. A >30% degree of symptom responsiveness to dopamine is a strong predictor of a good response to DBS surgery, though it is not mandatory. This has led most centers to require evaluation both on and off dopamine prior to the procedure to increase the likelihood of success. DBS is not currently considered to be a disease-modifying treatment. Shorter disease duration pre-operatively tends to lead to better results after surgery. The response from DBS is only as good as the patient's best "on" time, with the exception of tremor, which may show greater improvement than that seen with medication.

==== Target and therapy comparisons ====
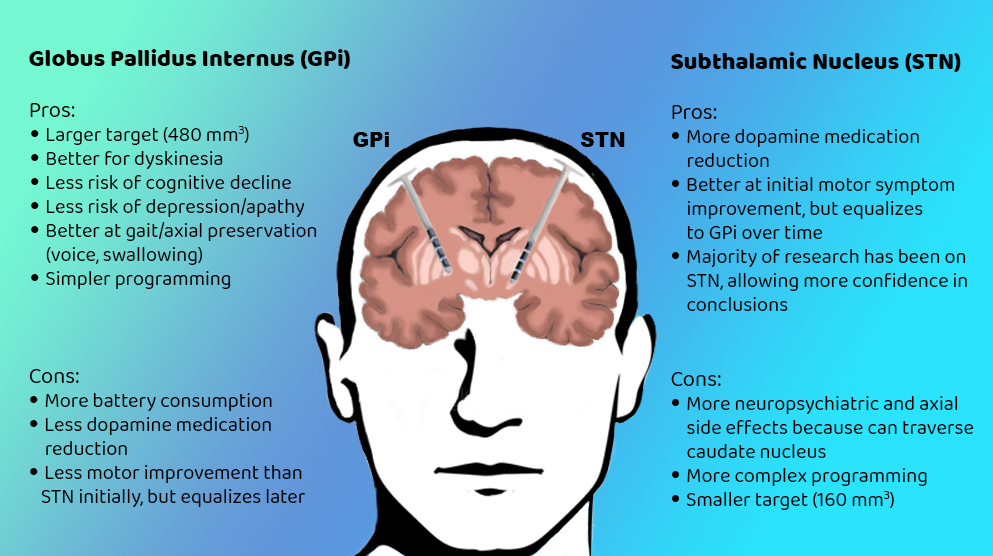
STN vs GPi with probe locations and pros and cons of each

Initially, the STN was considered superior to the GPi for tremor reduction, rigidity, and bradykinesia as well as enabling greater reductions in dopaminergic medication following surgery and the GPi superior for reducing dyskinesia. Longer-term studies have found the two targets to be equivalent in motor symptoms, but both relatively ineffective for cognitive and axial motor symptoms of Parkinson's disease such as gait, posture and speech.

Comparison of the STN and GPi in DBS is also inconsistent due to different medical centers tending to have better results with specific nuclei and studies focusing on short as opposed to long term results. The three most commonly studied targets to date are the globus pallidus internus (GPi), subthalamic nucleus (STN) and ventrointermediate nucleus (VIM). DBS has also been compared to infusion therapies such as intestinal levodopa and subcutaneous apomorphine. The vast majority of DBS research to date has been on the subthalamic nucleus.

A large inclusive meta analysis that compared the STN to the GPi between 6–12 months found the STN to be superior for motor symptoms and activities of daily living, but found studies to be too heterogenous or insufficient to compare the targets for dyskinesia, daily off time, quality of life, or levodopa reduction.

In longer-term studies, however, the impact of the two nuclei on motor symptoms equalizes, but the GPi becomes superior to the STN for improvement of activities of daily living and dyskinesia. Conversely, the STN is superior to the GPi for reduction of dopamine medication. Both short and long term analyses showed the targets to be equivalent as far as adverse events.

A meta-regression showed that combined with levodopa, the GPi preserved postural instability and gait disability better than the STN. Gait or dysarthria are often unaffected or even worsened by DBS, particularly in ON medication state. When comparing 60 vs 130 Hz, 60 Hz frequency substantially reduced gait freezing, but subsequent studies have not replicated this, often finding worsening motor symptoms and less gait benefit with lower frequencies. A recent retrospective study showed 64% of patients had subjective improvement of axial symptoms when switching from higher to lower frequency stimulation with increased voltage.

Since 2015, several experiments were carried out to assess the efficacy of aDBS (adaptive DBS), that uses beta-band power of the subthalamic local field potentials (LFPs) as target to adapt DBS parameters to motor fluctuations. Results of the experiments proved that aDBS is highly effective in controlling the patients PD symptoms in addition to the normal Levodopa therapy, reducing dyskinesias.

===== Short term comparisons =====
An indirect systems analysis compared the DBS to the STN, DBS of the GPi, subthalamotomy, jejunal levodopa, and subcutaneous apomorphine, in the first 6 months. Different results were seen depending on dopamine responsivity and whether motor symptoms (UPDRS II) or activities of daily living (UPDRS III) were assessed:

Symptom	Dopamine responsivity	Most effective therapy	Patient preference (%)
Motor symptoms (UPDRS III)	Dopamine unresponsive off state	Unilateral STN + contralateral subthalamotomy > Bilateral STN DBS > unilateral subthalamotomy > Bilateral GPi DBS	90% / 70% / 65% / 55%
Motor symptoms (UPDRS III)	Dopamine responsive on state	GPI = unilateral subthalamotomy + STN > jejunal levodopa	80% / 80% / 80%
Activities of daily living (UPDRS II)	Dopamine unresponsive off state	Unilateral STN + contralateral subthalamotomy > STN DBS > GPi DBS	90% / 70% / 64%
Activities of daily living (UPDRS II)	Dopamine responsive on state	Jejunal levodopa > STN DBS > unilateral pallidotomy	90% / 50% / 66%

A Bayesian analysis utilizing the minimal clinically important difference (MCID) compared DBS (predominantly of the STN and to a lesser degree GPi) to infusions of intestinal dopamine, apomorphine, and medical therapy. The analysis was significantly limited because it followed dopamine prospectively only to 3 months but other therapies such as DBS to five years. There was also a 10-fold difference in the quantity of DBS patients as compared to other therapies. They found LCIG to be similar to DBS, though with a wider confidence interval for dopamine due to lower quantity of participants. In the non-prospective cohort groups, LCIG lost its benefit for activities of daily living after 2–3 years. Both therapies were superior to apomorphine and best medical therapy for activities of daily living and "on" time for dopamine responsiveness, while DBS had the highest rate of adverse effects, particularly surgical and neuropsychiatric. LCIG was similar to DBS in effect on quality of life, though the analysis for levodopa was again underpowered.

A short term meta-analysis that primarily looked at changes within the first year found the STN to be better than the GPi for motor symptoms and activities of daily living, but they included studies that analyzed the targets separately. For activities of daily living (UPDRS II) with DBS during the dopamine unresponsive state, patients improved 50% with STN but only 20% with GPi. For motor symptoms (UPDRS III), there was a 50% with STN but only 30% with GPi-DBS. STN reduced dyskinesia by 64%, OFF time by 69%, improved QOL by 20%, Levodopa dose was reduced 50%. GPi insufficient data to assess for dyskinesia OFF time, and levodopa reduction.

A meta analysis following 1148 patients for a year and with an equal distribution between groups found that both STN and GPi improved motor function, but in different ways. GPi preserved postural instability and gait disability better than STN. GPi did not produce any significant improvement over STN in motor symptoms during the on state, though a point estimate favored the use of GPi. Motor symptoms in the off state showed that STN did not produce any significant improvement over GPi, though again a point estimate favored the use of STN. STN had a larger dopamine reduction than GPi, while GPi improved depression more than STN after surgery. Compared to the GPi, the STN showed more improvement in off state motor symptoms and activities of daily living. Conversely, the GPi was better than the STN for on state motor symptoms and activities of daily living, similar to data from the Netherlands NSTAPS study.

===== Long term comparisons =====
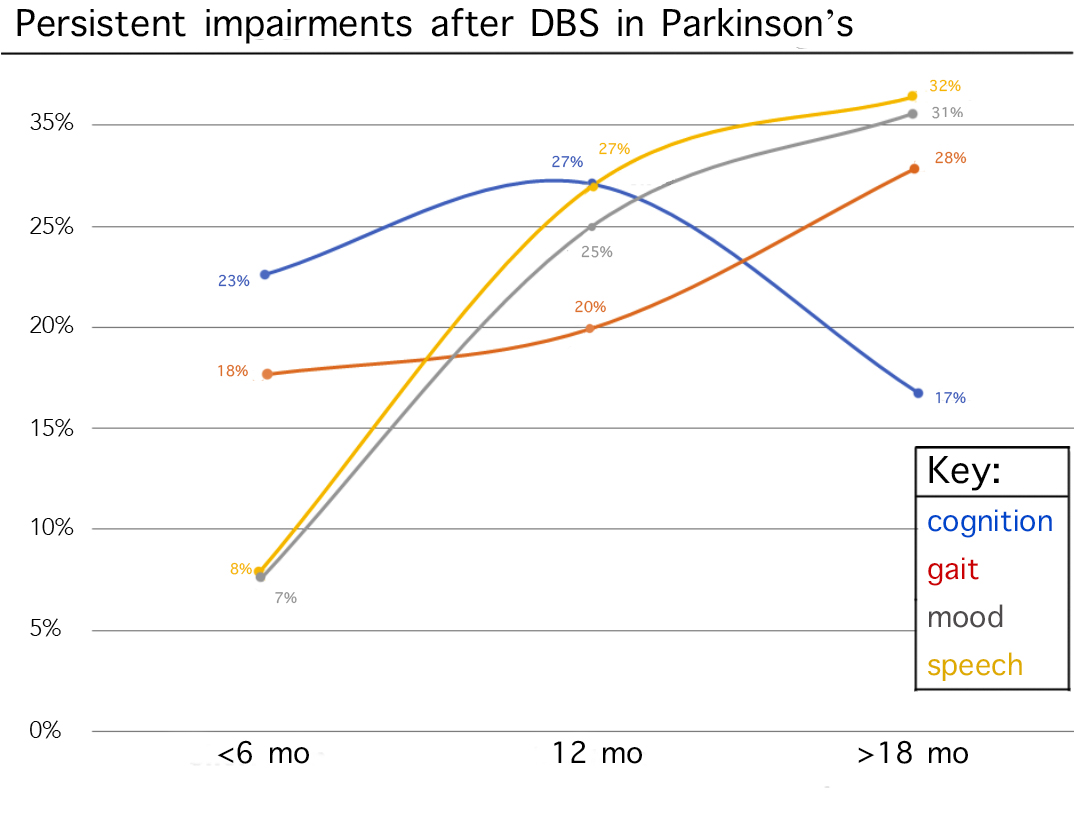
Persistent adverse effects after DBS can include a decline in speech, gait, loss of cognitive function, and depression, though problems with cognition mitigate after the first year.

In the longer term and with trials comparing targets head to head, STN and GPi were found to be equal for activities of daily living in the off state and for motor function in both the on and off state. GPi had less dyskinesia and improved activities of daily living in the on state for advanced Parkinson's disease. There was no significant difference between the STN and GPi for motor scores during the on medication phase. The GPi reduces dyskinesia through a medication independent mechanism and has less neuropsychiatric effects (i.e. depression, apathy, and suicide). The long term duration of therapeutic benefit has not been clearly established, though reports suggest that individuals may have sustained clinical improvement for at least 10 years.

There is usually a greater improvement in akinesia targeting the STN as compared to the pallidus, while there may be a wearing off of the initially excellent antiakinetic effect with pallidal stimulation after 5 years. Conversely, deep brain stimulation of the GPi has consistently shown superior and sustained reduction in dyskinesia. Although overall gait has been reported to improve consistently after DBS, postural instability, which can affect gait, is less likely to respond. A greater number of falls occur after surgery with DBS of the STN as compared to the GPi.

GPi programming requires less-intensive monitoring of medication and stimulation adjustments in most patients. The STN has multiple motor, cognitive, and limbic pathways that are not completely anatomically segregated. In contrast, the larger size of the GPi motor region reduces the likelihood of the current spreading into adjacent functional areas or to the internal capsule, causing less neuropsychological side effects, long term comorbidities and global cognitive decline. This could be due to the GPi being separate from the limbic component of the STN, the greater dopamine reduction allowed with STN stimulation, or that the vast preponderance of studies in the literature are about the STN, causing an inadvertent publication bias.

For individuals with unsatisfactory outcomes after DBS in Parkinson's, lead revision resulted in 30% improvement when leads were repositioned from the GPi to the STN, and no improvement when repositioned from the GPi to the STN. The cases in which improvement occurred were when there was clear evidence of lead mispositioning.

A Bayesian analysis comparing DBS with intestinal levodopa, subcutaneous apomorphine and best medical therapy found DBS and intestinal levodopa to be the superior treatments, though it did not distinguish specific nuclei as DBS targets. In the setting of this limitation, they found intestinal levodopa being the best at improving quality of life more and DBS being the best at reducing off time. A more specific Bayesian Monte Carlo analysis comparing individual nuclei found bilateral STN, GPi and intrajejunal levodopa to be better than either subcutaneous apomorphine or best medical therapy. Amongst the three, STN had the greatest likelihood of improvement, though it was not statistically significant.

==== Conventional and closed-loop comparisons ====
In a 2021 research study conducted by Alberto Priori, a comparative analysis was presented between the impacts on motor symptoms between conventional deep brain stimulation (cDBS) and closed-loop adaptive deep brain stimulation (aDBS) in patients with Parkinson's disease. This work highlighted the safety and effectiveness of aDBS stimulation compared to cDBS in a daily session, both in terms of motor performance and TEED to the patient. Simon Little has regarded aDBS approach to be superior to conventional DBS in PD in primates using cortical neuronal spike triggering and in humans employing local field potential biomarkers. While presenting a protocol for a pseudo-randomised clinical study for adaptive deep brain stimulation as advanced Parkinson's disease treatment, it was shown that aDBS do not induce dysarthria, in contrast to cDBS. Also it has been suggested that aDBS and cDBS can improve patient's axial symptoms to a similar extent, but compared with cDBS, aDBS significantly improves its main symptom, bradykinesia.

==== Post operative complications ====
The overall rate of intracranial hemorrhage at surgery is 5%, with symptomatic hemorrhage in 2% and hemorrhage causing permanent deficit or death in 1%. Stroke occurred in 1%, infection in 8%, lead erosion without infection in 2%, lead fracture in 8%, lead migration in 10%, and death in 2%. Additional adverse events include the need for revision in 5%, lead malposition 3%, surgical site complications 3%, hardware-related complications 2%, and seizure 2%. There was a significant non-linear increase with each additional track, for example in situations when leads needed to be repositioned or in multiple target procedures.

In the short term, studies have reported a risk of cerebral hemorrhage of 1.4%, hardware infection 1.1%, post operative mental status change occurred in 4.6%, and seizure occurred in 1.4%; in the longer term adverse events include confusion at 3.9%, hardware infection at 4.5%, implantable pulse generator malfunction 1.4%.

Image guided lead placement tends to have shorter surgical times, lower rates of intracranial hemorrhage, and less complications. Combined methods that use both microelectrode recording and image guidance are not as brief in operating room time and have a higher risk of hemorrhage, but result in more accurate lead placement.

==== Caregivers ====
More than half of caregivers rate DBS to the STN negatively at one year after surgery. Some of the symptoms caregivers were unhappy about included mania, apathy, depression, impulsivity, compulsivity, aggressiveness and disinhibition. Children of individuals with Parkinson's tended to be happier than spouses. Concerns raised by caregivers included dyskinesia impacting the physiognomy of their loved ones, leading to the inability to control movements and a glassy-eyed appearance. Family relationships changed between partners and children were also stressed because the empathy and self-awareness of patients diminished as they lost their sense of reality over time. The degree of dissatisfaction did not appear to correlate with the success of the surgery as far as motor symptoms, which generally improved. Similar dissatisfaction persisted at two years in a separate analysis, with almost 60% of caregivers continuing to report dissatisfaction.

Despite the high dissatisfaction rate of caregivers with surgery, additional measures such as caregiver burden, psychiatric and cognitive functioning and caregiver quality of life remained relatively stable. In addition, both patients and caregivers reported that they would opt for DBS again.

==== Dyskinesia ====
DBS for the GPi has a direct effect on dyskinesia reduction and is more effective than DBS to the STN, with the latter being dependent on dopamine reduction. As such, pallidal surgery is indicated when dyskinesia is a dose-limiting factor preventing higher levels of needed dopaminergic therapy. STN stimulation can also induce persistent contralateral dyskinesia, and in some cases require a repeat surgery to implant GPi rescue leads.

==== Gait ====
The effect on gait is inconsistent, with multiple studies showing worsening of gait, balance and speech as potential complications of DBS, with DBS to the STN carrying a higher risk of gait dysfunction. A study delineating adverse effects by time found that though DBS mitigated gait symptoms after surgery, postoperative postural instability and gait disorders worsened in the long term.

When axial symptoms are responsive to dopaminergic medications, they are likely to improve with DBS. Several studies reported gait improvement with either STN or GPi DBS, including reduction in freezing of gait, though GPi is generally associated with preserved gait function compared with STN, and generally more favorable for those with axial symptoms, gait issues, depression, and word fluency problems.

Electromyography studies of the lower limbs in the study of gait have shown that dopaminergic medication increases distal lower limb muscle activity while STN DBS increases both proximal and distal lower limb muscle activity.

In the context of chronic levodopa therapy, the most relevant effect of STN neurostimulation is improvement of motor function during the off state, the period during which symptoms are non responsive to dopamine.

==== Genitourinary and other symptoms ====
Benefit after STN DBS has been reported in nonmotor fluctuating symptoms, including urinary dysfunction, sialorrhea, sleep, PD-related pain, and off-period sweating.

The globus pallidus is targeted in both Parkinson's and dystonia.

A meta analysis predominantly looking at DBS to the STN found it led to less urinary urgency, increased bladder capacity and maximum urinary flow rate. Another meta analysis study further distinguished effects by target subgroups, finding that DBS of the GPi and STN have an inhibitory effect on detrusor function at the pelvic floor, leading to an increase in functional urine capacity and retention. DBS of the VIM has the opposite effect, leading to detrusor excitation and improved voiding.

==== Mortality ====
Long term mortality rates with DBS measure up to 17% with an average age at death of 71 years, with the risk of mortality being more pronounced in cases of advanced disease. DBS of the STN has a three-fold increased mortality compared to the GPi in Parkinson's patients, with most deaths being due to postoperative complications and not directly related to the stimulation itself.

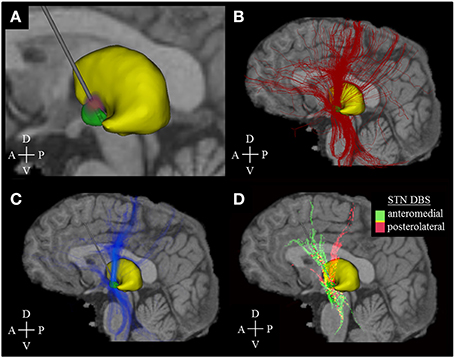
The subthalamic nucleus, immediately above the substantia nigra and below the thalamus, is the most common target for treatment in Parkinson's

==== Neuropsychological effects and suicide ====
Neurologic side effects of deep-brain stimulation include cognitive impairment, memory deficits, difficulties with speech, disequilibrium, dysphagia, and motor and sensory disturbances. Potential psychological side effects include mania, depression, apathy, laughter, crying, panic, fear, anxiety, and suicidal ideation. It is important that individuals be screened before and after the procedure for suicidal ideation, impulsivity (e.g., gambling, impulsive shopping, hypersexuality, etc.), and dopamine dysregulation, an addiction-like syndrome associated with the use of levodopa. The STN, at approximately 160 mm^{3}, is one-third the size of the GPi (on average 480 mm^{3}) and has multiple nearby non-motor pathways, the inadvertent activation of which has been suggested to be the cause of emotional dysregulation that can be seen when it is targeted.

Cognitively, decreased verbal fluency and an increased risk for dementia can occur due to the wire passing through the prefrontal cortex and caudate nucleus, a path more often seen with subthalamic stimulation than GPi due to its more inferomedial positioning. Long-term follow-up showed a more rapid decline in cognitive function with treatment targeting the subthalamic nucleus than that targeting the GPi. Without surgery, the risk of developing dementia in Parkinson's is approximately 10% per year with a mean prevalence of 40% across the disease and a lifetime incidence of 80%. One large meta-analysis suggested the likelihood of dementia increases by 2.5 fold, though the subpopulation in the analysis was limited in quantity. Another meta analysis suggested the incidence as the same. Additional cognitive changes after STN in Parkinson's were mixed and included an improvement in reaction time, but also more errors in tasks involving response inhibition.

Potential neuropsychiatric side effects in the short term can occur due to lesional effects, causing disinhibition, mania, hallucinations, hypersexuality, and euphoria. In the long term, this tendency inverts and can evolve into apathy, depression and even suicidal ideation. Some studies report a prevalence of apathy after surgery as high as 70%. These effects can be due to misplacement of electrodes, miscalibration, or even well placed electrodes that inadvertently stimulate adjacent limbic circuits adjacent to the target nuclei. Though dopamine withdrawal syndrome due to the reduced dose of levodopa required after surgery (typically 70%) could contribute to these findings, it does not completely account for them.

The majority of studies indicate an increased risk of suicidal ideation and suicide attempts after treatment with DBS. Concerningly, though preoperative screening for depression and suicide are done to mitigate this risk, some studies have shown no evident difference in pre-operative depressive or cognitive status between suicidal and nonsuicidal individuals after surgery. The risk of suicide is more pronounced with treatment to the STN than the pallidus, with studies as soon as 6 months showing increased proxy symptoms of suicide such as depression, isolation, tearfulness, anger, anxiety and hallucinations. As with other neuropsychiatric effects that are more common with the STN, it is thought to be due to a combination of the levodopa dose reduction that occurs after surgery, adjacent subthalamic limbic circuit activation and disinhibition.

Both depression and euphoria have been reported after DBS. Comparative studies between the STN and GPi have suggested higher depression rates for the STN. With acute neurostimulation to the STN, depression can occur after left sided stimuation, whereas right sided stimulation can produce mirthful laughter.

The improvement in motor symptoms but progressive deterioration of axial symptoms such as gait, vocal control, and neuropsychiatric side effects has led to a new phenotype of Parkinson's patient in the long term with mitigated or well controlled non axial motor symptoms, but with progressive worsening of axial motor symptoms (bradykinesia, dysarthria, postural instability, freezing of gait) and cognitive symptoms such as dementia and hallucinations.

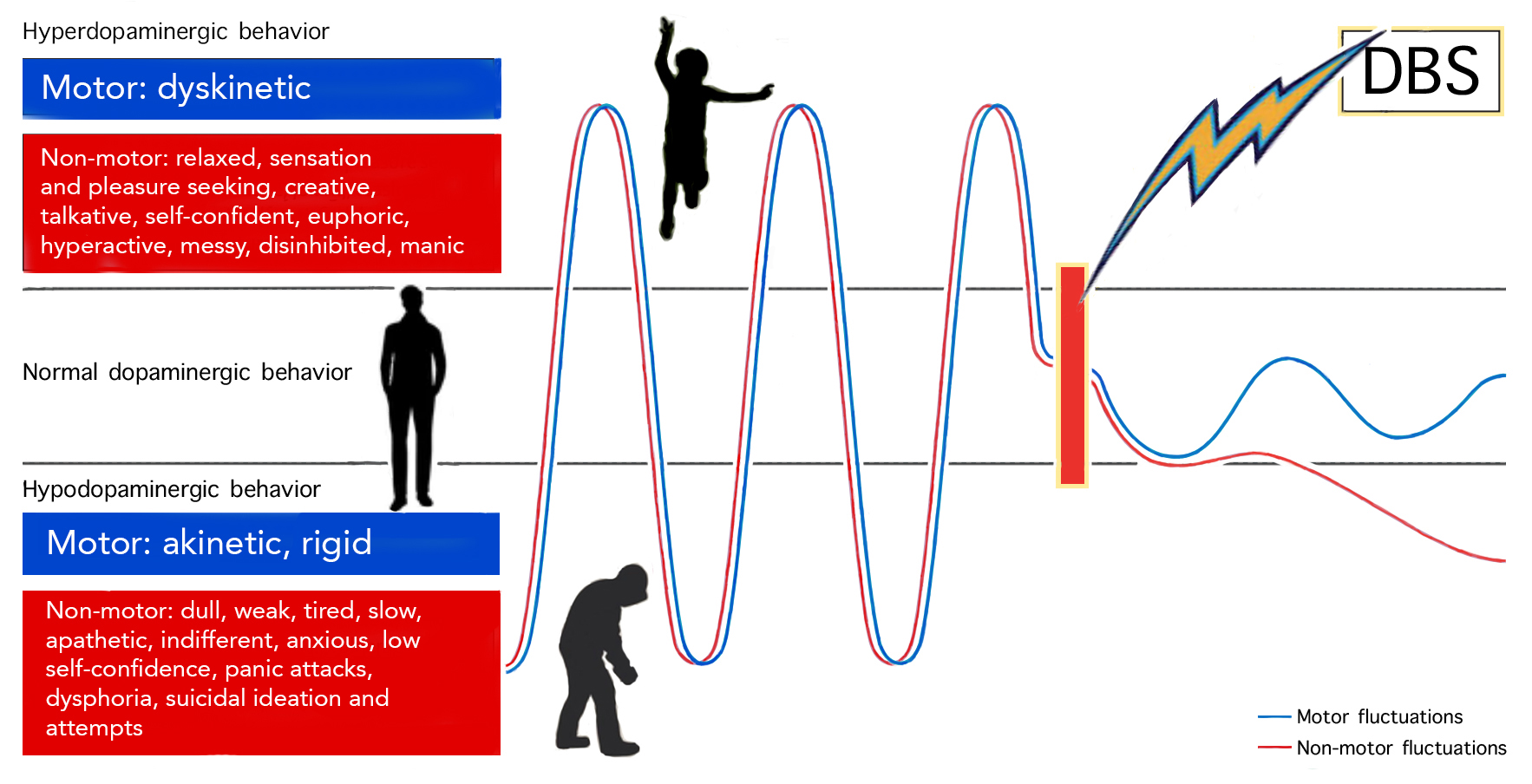
DBS improves non-axial motor symptoms with Parkinson's, leading to a new chronic phenotype dominated by axial motor symptoms (gait dysfunction, dysarthria, camptocormia) and cognitive decline, features which generally do not improve and can worsen after surgery.

At baseline, the total lifetime risk of suicide in Parkinson's at baseline is 22% for ideation and 1% for attempts, with the general population at 13% ideation and 5% attempts.

==== Posture ====
Parkinson's is often characterized by camptocormia, a classic stooped kyphotic posture that develops as the disease progresses as well as Pisa syndrome, characterized by a persistent tilted posture. The impact of DBS to the STN or GPi on posture in Parkinson's have been heterogenous and inconsistent at best. Though some studies have shown positive effect, the quality of evidence is quite low.

The pedunculopontine nucleus (PPN) is being studied as a target for postural instability and gait freezing, but clinical research is still in its early stages. It is located in the mesopontine tegmentum next to the crossing of the superior cerebellar peduncle and is theorized to play a role in reflex reactions, sleep-wake cycles, posture and gait. It is inhibited by the GPi while the STN excites it. Freezing, as part of the pattern of akinesia, usually responds to levodopa. When freezing of gait persists, and is not improved by drugs, it is usually not improved by STN stimulation. The loss of verbal fluency after PPN or VIM stimulation is greater than even that seen with the STN.

==== Quality of life ====
A study comparing quality of life and adverse affects from patient perspective found that DBS had a more positive effect on quality of life than subcutaneous apomorphine, intestinal dopamine and best medical therapy, but also the highest rate of adverse effects. DBS has been found to be superior to best medical therapy in impact on quality of life, though no study to date has shown to favor the GPi or STN specifically. A Bayesian analysis found intestinal dopamine has been shown to be superior to both DBS and best medical therapy for quality of life. Younger age, early onset of Parkinson's, less dyskinesia, and higher quality of life before surgery predict higher quality of life following the procedure.

==== Sleep ====
The effects of DBS on sleep are heterogenous but it generally improves in quality over time. There is an increase of complex behavior during REM sleep after surgery independent of DBS target, while REM sleep without atonia increases with STN and decreases with GPi.

==== Speech and swallowing ====
Almost 40% of patients develop speech impairment after DBS to the STN, with only 10% improving after reprogramming. DBS to the GPi improves speech, in contrast to the STN, thalamus or zona incerta. Up to 33% of patients can develop problems with speech after bilateral DBS to the STN, both by formal metrics and as subjectively reported by individuals and their families. This is less than that seen after thalamotomy (40%). The numbers are significantly lower for unilateral treatment, at 10-15%, but the symptomatic improvement with this is also one-sided, making it more appropriate for individuals with asymmetric disease.

Speech impairment occurs in up to 20% of patients with DBS to the VIM of the thalamus. Focused ultrasound, by comparison, causes speech impairment in 15% of patients when done unilaterally and 40% when bilateral.

Swallowing function after DBS can be impacted, analysis showing that it is either stable or improved after DBS to the GPi and has more variable effect after DBS to the STN, possibly worsening in on medication states, but stable or improved in off states.

Speech disorders are more common after STN surgery, though dysphagia is more common after DBS to the GPi, an important finding because aspiration pneumonia is the most common cause of death in Parkinson's. The two nuclei have differing effects on the pedunculopontine nucleus, which in turn affects swallowing through the solitary nucleus. The GPi inhibits the PPN, while the STN excites it.

==== Parkinsonian Tremor ====
For Parkinson's tremor alone, DBS has similar efficacy to MR guided focused ultrasound. DBS of the VIM is more commonly done with tremor-dominant variants of Parkinson's and essential tremor. It can cause dysarthria in about 20% of patients. A Bayesian meta-analysis comparing multiple targets found STN DBS to be best for motor symptoms over the GPi and caudal zona incerta, but DBS as similar in efficacy to MR guided focused ultrasound for essential tremor. DBS of the subthalamic nucleus has a more sudden effect on tremor, while tremor reduction in GPi can be delayed.

A forest plot meta analysis found that DBS targeted at GPi and STN in the on-medication phase were similar; however, in the off-medication phase, Vim-targeted DBS was the superior target and could be a choice as a DBS target for tremor-dominant Parkinsonism.

==== Methodological limitations ====
In trials on interventions, symptom scales such as the Unified Parkinson's Disease Rating Scale (UPDRS III) are typically used. These metrics measure motor function with a score from 0 to 108. Alternatively, the 39-item Parkinson's disease questionnaire (PDQ-39) has been utilized to measure disease specific quality of life with a score between 0 and 100. The effectiveness of an intervention is usually based on comparison of these scores in treatment and control groups. It has been pointed out that a statistically significant numerical difference in a scale or questionnaire does not necessarily translate to a clinically meaningful impact for the individual. Beyond this, the scales can be subjective and susceptible to placebo effects and physician bias. The minimal important difference (MID) or minimal clinically important difference (MCID) has been suggested as a more pragmatic metric to standardize the clinical impact of an intervention, though it has not yet been widely adopted. It is defined as the smallest difference in symptom scores that an individual would consider clinically meaningful.

=== Essential tremor ===
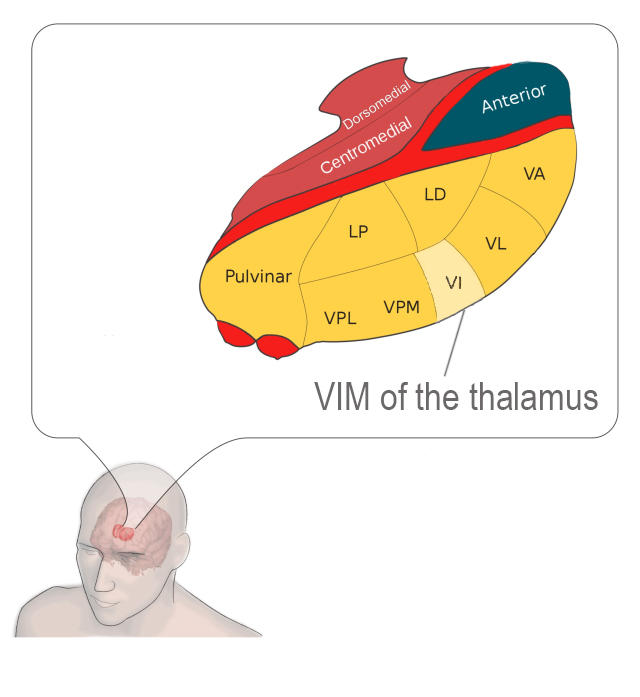
The ventrointermediate nucleus of the thalamus, the target nucleus for essential and Parkinson's tremor.

Essential tremor, the most common movement disorder, is a chronic condition characterized by involuntary and rhythmic shaking. It was the first indication to be approved for DBS (alongside Parkinsonian tremor) and before DBS had a long history of being treated with ablative brain lesioning.

Frequencies above 100 Hz are most effective for cessation of tremor, while lower frequencies have less effect. In clinical practice, frequencies between 80 and 180 Hz are typically applied. DBS electrodes commonly target the ventrointermediate nucleus of the thalamus (VIM) or ventrally adjacent areas in the zona incerta or posterior thalamus. Multiple targets along the circuitry of the cerebellothalamic pathway (also referred to as the dentatorubrothalamic or dentatothalamic tract) have been shown to have similar therapeutic effect.

Possible side effects of DBS for essential tremor include speech difficulties and paresthesia. Similar targets have previously been applied to treat essential tremor using surgical lesioning, for instance using MR-guided Focused Ultrasound, Gamma-Knife Radiosurgery or conventional radiofrequency lesioning. The annual volume of MRgFUS thalamotomies has overtaken DBS for treatment of tremor.

aDBS may be an effective tool in the treatment of essential tremor (ET), which is one of the most common neurological movement disorders. aDBS for ET is however more focused on a closed-loop technology based on external sensors. In a recent study, H J Chizeck presented the first translation-ready training procedure for a fully embedded aDBS control system for MDs and one of the first examples of such a system in ET.

=== Dystonia ===
DBS is also used to treat dystonia, a movement disorder characterized by sustained repetitive muscle contractions causing painful abnormal postures and involuntary movements. DBS is effective in treating primary generalized dystonia, and also used for focal variants such as cervical and task-specific dystonias. In studies targeting the GPi using high frequency DBS there were improvements of ~45% within the first six months of treatment.

In contrast to some symptoms in Parkinson's disease or essential tremor, improvements in dystonia are appear over weeks to months. The delay is thought to be a consequence of the complexity of dystonic motor circuits and the time required for long-term neuroplastic remodeling. Despite its slower onset, many individuals experience lasting and meaningful improvements.

Recent large-scale mapping efforts have suggested slightly different optimal target sites for different kinds of dystonia.

The applications of aDBS in the treatment of dystonia have significantly evolved over the past few years. Low-frequency oscillations (LFO) detected in the internal globus pallidus of dystonia patients have been identified as a physiomarker for adaptive Deep Brain Stimulation (aDBS). Moreover, the characteristics of pallidal low-frequency -namely, average low-frequency (LF) oscillatory power (4-12 Hz) - and beta bursts can be helpful in implementing adaptive brain stimulation in the context of parkinsonian and dystonic internal globus pallidus.[23] A significant amount of scientific research to date on pathological oscillations in dystonia has been focused to address potential biomarkers that might be used as a feedback signal for controlling aDBS in patients with dystonia.

=== Obsessive–compulsive disorder ===
DBS for OCD, Tourette's Syndrome, and dystonia were first completed in 1999. The original target studied was the anterior limb of the internal capsule, though multiple sites have been probed since then. Within the internal capsule, large probabilistic mapping trials have identified two therapeutic sites, one thought to corresponding to the direct pathway in the basal ganglia to the subthalamic nucleus and other midbrain regions, the other indirect.

A potential circuit structure that seems to combine most effective targets in both the ALIC and STN region has been identified and termed the OCD response tract, though multiple targets have been probed and found to have effect.

DBS for OCD received a humanitarian device exemption from the FDA in 2009. In Europe, the CE Mark for Deep Brain Stimulation (DBS) for obsessive–compulsive disorder (OCD) was active from 2009 to 2022 but not renewed due to a lack of government health coverage.

=== Epilepsy ===
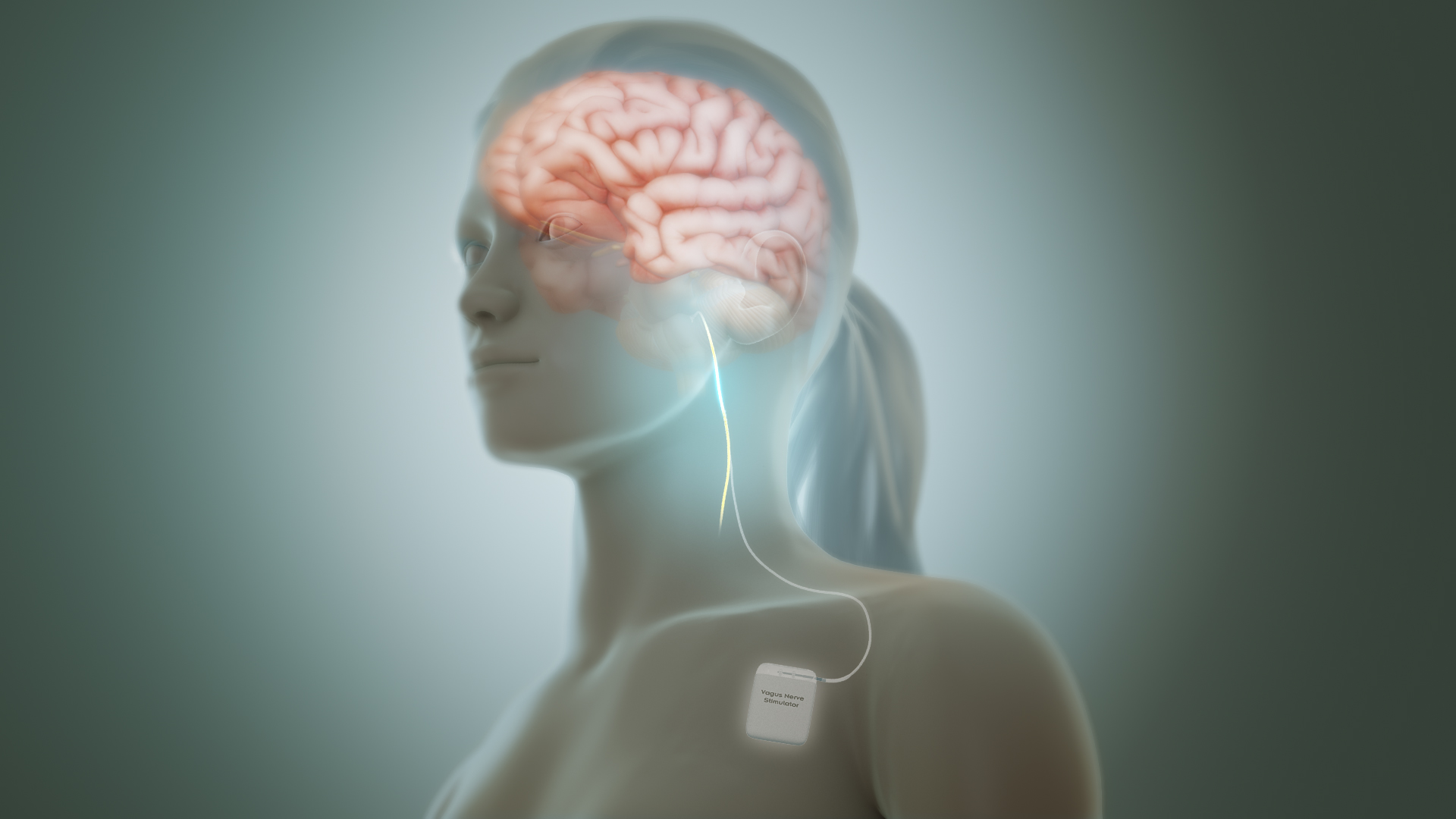
Vagus nerve stimulator for epilepsy.

DBS has been studied for treatment resistant epilepsy with seizure foci not amenable to surgical resection or vagus nerve stimulation; almost 40% of individuals with the disease are inadequately treated with medication alone.

Responsive neurostimulation is a form of adaptive brain stimulation that targets the anterior nucleus of the thalamus. The anterior nuclei of the thalamus is the only FDA approved target for epilepsy treatment, with some individuals achieving more than a 50% decrease in seizures. Other brain regions being studied as potential targets include:

- Centromedian nucleus (CM): Located in the thalamus, CM-DBS has been used in some cases of generalized epilepsy, including Lennox-Gastaut syndrome. It targets the thalamocortical networks involved in seizure propagation and has been reported to help reduce seizure severity and frequency.
- Hippocampus: Particularly in patients with temporal lobe epilepsy, hippocampal DBS has been investigated as an option due to its role in seizure propagation and memory function. Studies have generally shown promising results, particularly for temporal lobe seizures.
- Subthalamic nucleus (STN): Commonly used in Parkinson's disease, the STN has also been explored as a target for epilepsy due to its involvement in motor control and seizure modulation. Initial studies have shown seizure reduction, especially in patients with the focal subtype of the disease.

=== Tourette syndrome ===
DBS has been used experimentally for individuals with severe Tourette syndrome that do not respond to conventional treatment. Despite early successes, DBS remains a highly experimental procedure for the illness, with more study needed to fully understand its clinical effects. The procedure is well tolerated, but complications include "short battery life, abrupt symptom worsening upon cessation of stimulation, hypomanic or manic conversion, and the significant time and effort involved in optimizing stimulation parameters". The first clinical use of DBS for Tourette's Syndrome was carried out in 1999 in follow up to earlier studies on ablative lesions.

The procedure is invasive and expensive and requires long-term expert care and its benefits for severe Tourette's are inconclusive. Tourette's is more common in children, tending to remit spontaneously in adulthood, limiting the applicability of surgery in these populations. It also may not always be obvious how to utilize DBS for a particular person because the diagnosis of Tourette's is based on a history of symptoms rather than an examination of neurological activity.

The Tourette Association of America recommends that the procedure be reserved for adults with severe debilitating treatment resistant variants of the disease, and without comorbidities such as substance abuse or personality disorders.

aDBS is currently being studied to be used as a potential treatment for TS. A 2017 research study presented a review on the available literature supporting the feasibility of an LFP-based aDBS approach in patients with TS. In addition to that, researchers have put forward several explorative findings regarding LFP data recently acquired and analysed in patients with TS after DBS electrode implantation at rest, during voluntary and involuntary movements (tics), and during ongoing DBS. It was found out that LFPs recorded from DBS targets can be used to control new aDBS devices capable of adaptive stimulation responsive to the symptoms of TS.

=== Depression ===
Though depression can be a contraindication for electrostimulation of other chronic neurologic diseases in the basal ganglia, the therapy can also be used for treatment of severe depression. The target for electrostimulation in depression is more anterior and superficial at the frontal lobes, as opposed to other motor disorders where it is deeper in the basal ganglia. Beginning in the 1950s, treatment has been attempted in the subcallosal cingulate region and the ventral capsule/ventral striatum have shown mixed outcomes.

Diffusion-weighted imaging based tractography has led to the theoretical discovery of the so-called 'depression switch', the intersection of four bundles that allowed more deliberate targeting of DBS in the subcallosal area and improved results in additional open-label studies. While anatomical descriptions as well as supposed mechanisms for this target site have been debated, clinical effects of this DBS target in patients with TRD have been promising.

=== Chronic pain ===
Stimulation of the periaqueductal gray and periventricular gray for nociceptive pain, and the internal capsule, ventral posterolateral nucleus, and ventral posteromedial nucleus for neuropathic pain has produced impressive results with some people, but results vary. One study of 17 people with intractable cancer pain found that 13 were virtually pain-free and only four required opioid analgesics on release from hospital after the intervention. Most ultimately did resort to opioids, usually in the last few weeks of life. DBS has also been applied for phantom limb pain.

== Adverse effects ==
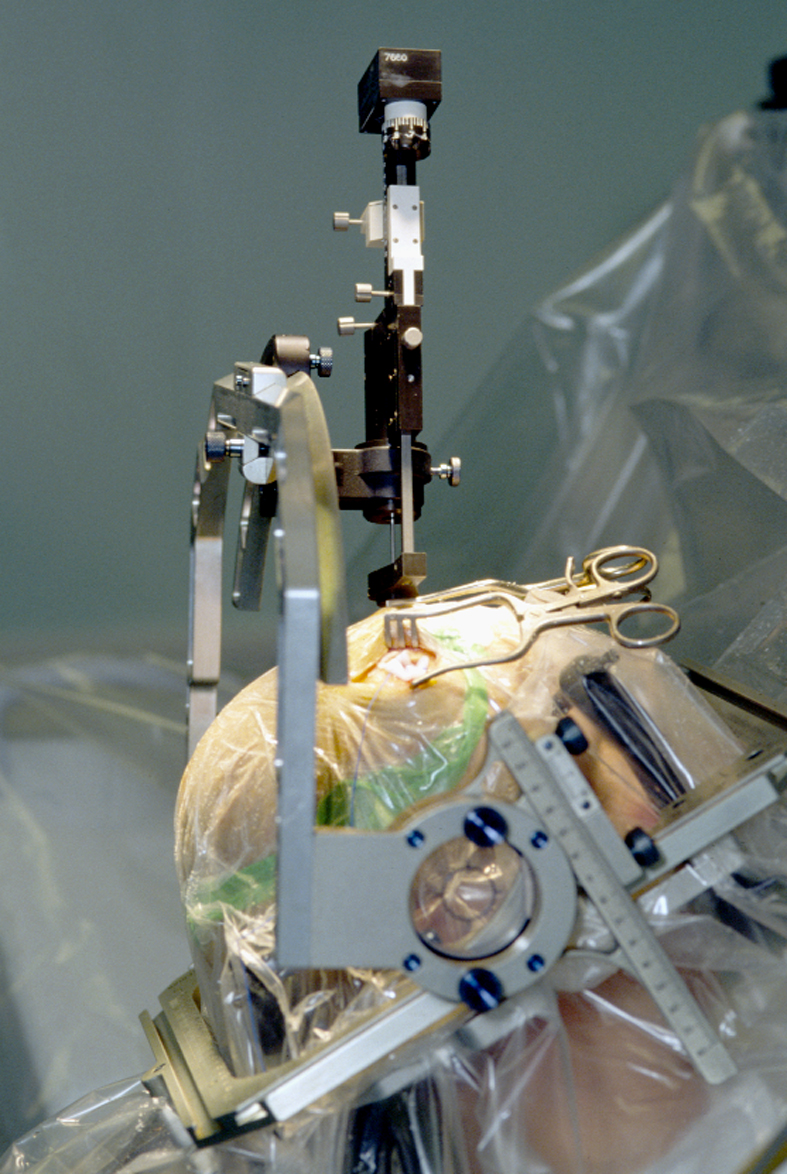
The brain can shift slightly during stereotactic surgery, leading to complications.

The possible negative effects of DBS can be divided into two categories: short-term in the immediate post operative period, and long-term on the scale of months to years.

Hardware related complications include bleeding inside the head (1–2%), infection (5%) skin erosion (0.5%), lead migration (1.5%), lead fracture (1.5%), IPG malfunction (1%), which may require repositioning or a stay in the neurological intensive care unit. Long term negative effects of the device include an increased risk of decreased mental function and dementia beyond that typically seen with chronic neurologic disorders. Tourette's syndrome and epilepsy are more at risk of hardware related complications, with Parkinson's having the lowest rates, possibly due to abnormal mechanical positioning and picking behaviors associated with the former two conditions. Delayed brain edema can occur after lead placement, but is usually self limited.

Because the brain can shift slightly during surgery, the electrodes can become displaced or dislodged, though electrode misplacement can be suspected by lack of clinical effect when the leads are turned on and a sudden dramatic increase in electrode impedance. The displacement can be physically located using CT scan, which would then guide a repeat intervention for repositioning. After surgery, swelling of the brain tissue, mild disorientation, and sleepiness are normal. After 2–4 weeks, the sutures are removed and the neurostimulator is activated.

Expectations can impact surgical outcomes, with individuals that had more positive expectations generally having better motor outcomes. Bradykinesia was in particular responsible to verbal suggestions. The placebo response rate in the Parkinson's population similar to other neurologic diseases at 16% (range 0-55%). Conversely, those that had unrealistic expectations surrounding surgery because they anticipated improvement and symptoms that are not typically addressed by neurostimulation, reported being unhappy about the outcome as well. With regards to particular symptoms, expectations of improvements in motor symptoms and medication reduction were mostly met, whereas expectations regarding non-motor issues such as speech, balance, and walking problems were not.

MRIs can be obtained after the procedure when necessary, but they have to be done under strict guidelines due to risks such as heating of the leads and to a lesser degree lead migration. The current FDA approved manufacturer (Medtronic) recommendations are interrogation of the system prior to the MRI; assessment of impedance to rule out short or open circuits and compromise of system integrity; that the DBS be off, programmed at zero volts, bipolar mode with the magnetic switch disabled, only a 1.5-T MRI head transmit/receive coil with specific absorption rate of less than 0.1 W/kg in the head. Multiple centers have found these guidelines to be overly cautious.

== Closed-loop systems ==
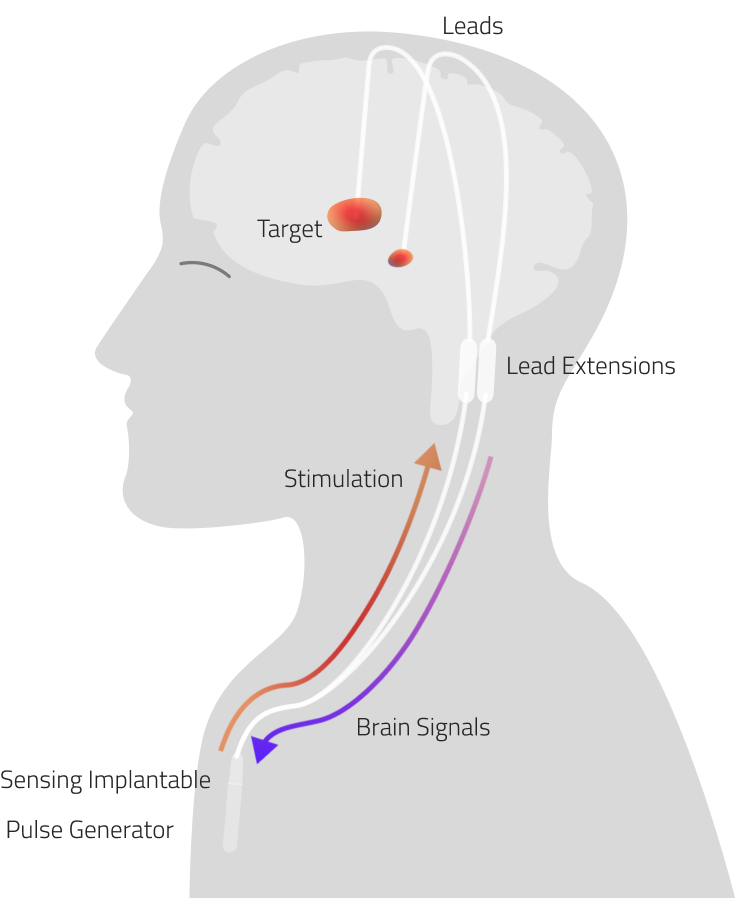

Closed-loop deep brain stimulation (clDBS) is a neuro-modulatory technique currently under investigation for the treatment of neurodegenerative diseases. It differs from conventional DBS systems (that provide constant stimulation) in that it can both sense the brain activity and deliver the appropriate stimulation in real time. The working mechanism of conventional DBS involved the continuous stimulation of the target structure, which is an approach that cannot adapt to patients' changing symptoms or functional status in real-time.

In the early days of DBS, closed loop applications were carried out by multiple pioneers, such as José Delgado, Robert Heath, Natalia Bechtereva and Carl Wilhelm Sem-Jacobsen long before the advent of 'modern' DBS. Perhaps the earliest closed-loop experiment in an animal model was performed by Delgado and colleagues in 1969. In the modern era of DBS following the introduction of the method by Alim Louis Benabid, after a demonstration of efficacy of aDBS in the macaque by the team of Hagai Bergman in 2011, the first in-human application of aDBS was carried out by the team of Peter Brown in 2013, followed by the team of Alberto Priori in the same year.

Keeping in view this unwanted side effect of DBS, concepts that have the capability to sense brain activity and automatically adjust the stimulation in response to fluctuating biomarkers, were re-introduced by multiple teams, with a first peer-reviewed publication in modern times by the teams of Hagai Bergman (in primates) and Peter Brown (in humans), followed by the team of Alberto Priori in the same year. The study, followed by others testing more patients in longer time windows (up to 24 hours) supported the hypothesis that aDBS is effective in controlling PD symptoms while reducing side effects of constant stimulation.

The device used in these studies was the external component of the AlphaDBS system developed by Newronika. While these advancements were ongoing, Medtronic published the architecture of an implantable aDBS device for application in humans. This design was embedded in Medtronic's Activa PC + S research device, allowing LFP sensing and recording while delivering targeted DBS therapy. This device was used in 2018 by a research team led by Philip A. Starr at the University of California, San Francisco, in a public-private partnership with Medtronic. The researchers inserted the device into two patients with Parkinson's disease who had traditional DBS but continued to experience dyskinesia after adjustment by a neurologist. Later on, they compared the results of the adaptive stimulation system with traditional stimulation set manually on two patients, and found that the adaptive approach was as effective at controlling symptoms as constant stimulation. The AlphaDBS implantable system by Newronika was developed and CE-marked in 2021. A systematic study was also conducted to highlight safety and efficacy of aDBS vs cDBS using this new generation of DBS IPG in PD.

In early 2025, Medtronic achieved the CE mark as the first clinically available closed-loop system in the world, Adaptive deep brain stimulation (aDBS), and the technology is now being used in the European Union and the United Kingdom, though it has yet to receive FDA or Medicare approval in the United States. Closed feedback loop systems deliver a lower total charge to the brain over time because their trigger for neurostimulation is based on a threshold signal from the individual themselves, rather than being assigned through external programming of the device by a clinician. Studies have shown lower total electrical energy delivered with adaptive DBS and a 40% reduction in motor symptoms, though research thus far comparing adaptive and conventional DBS has suffered from publication bias. The AlphaDBS represents a new generation commercially available DBS implantable pulse generator (IPG) for DBS and sensing, with aDBS capabilities. A double-blind systematic multicentre international study consisted of six investigational sites (in Italy, Poland and the Netherlands) was also conducted to highlight safety and efficacy of aDBS vs cDBS using this a new generation of DBS IPG in PD (AlphaDBS system by Newronika SpA, Milan, Italy). The Medtronic PC+S device was also developed in a commercial IPG allowing stimulation and sensing, the Percept PC, which is approved for aDBS delivery in Japan. Nobutaka Hattori and the group performed a research study, focused on exploring the case of a 51-year-old man with Parkinson's disease (PD) presenting with motor fluctuations, who received bilateral subthalamic deep brain stimulation (DBS) the Percept PC device, showing the feasibility of the approach. While these new devices seem to have various applications in terms of facilitating condition-dependent stimulation, and providing new insights into the pathophysiological mechanisms of PD, they are currently under investigation in larger clinical studies, to definitely allow their use in clinical practice.

In both open and closed-loop systems, there are a basic set of neurostimulator parameters can be modified such as choice of contact configuration (monopolar, bipolar, double monopolar, double bipolar), stimulation amplitude, pulse width, and frequency. Segmented leads were introduced in 2015, allowing the possibility of steering and orienting the stimulation horizontally. This led to both an increased specificity of treatment zone and an increase in time needed for device programming. Symptom specific and task-dependent neurostimulation, similar to rate adaptive cardiac pacemakers, is under development but not yet clinically available.

Though a wide variety of sources have been studied as feedback loops to trigger neurostimulation, the two that have been clinically tested are electricocortical and kinetic. Electricocortical signals in the brain can be recorded by an unused DBS electrode contact via electrocorticography. Kinetic signals are triggered by wearable technology that detects tremor, usually a gyroscope or accelerometer. Most electrocortically based feedback devices thus far have used beta activity as the primary feedback signal, though this does not always correlate with symptomatology. A minority have used wearable devices. Besides tremor, wearables can be used to track other motor symptoms like bradykinesia, levodopa induced dyskinesia, freezing of gait, festination, and balance impairment. Wireless nanoparticles, neurochemical ionic changes, local neurotransmitter level, electrode-electrolyte interfaces, and impedance spectroscopy, amongst others, are currently being researched for adaptive systems.

Microelectrodes can be used for local neuronal firing patterns while macroelectrodes can be used to detect local field potentials, whose detection correlates with time locked bursts of neuronal spikes from synchronous neural oscillations.

A challenge of closed-loop DBS is the obscuration of brain activity from artifact of the neurostimulation itself. By recording and stimulating in the same area, DBS devices capture the impulses of the delivered electric stimulation. While theoretically useful as a feedback signal, this artifact must be carefully filtered to prevent saturation of the sensing amplifiers and introduction of fictitious resonant information. This issue has been partially mitigated by advancements in wire insulation, but it still persists. An alternative input signal for aDBS that has been suggested is the evoked resonant neural activity, as it has a better signal to noise ratio than beta oscillations.

=== Mechanism of adaptation ===
To adapt to the stimulation parameters, adaptive DBS (aDBS) employs the local field potential (LFP) of the target structure recorded through the implanted electrodes that deliver stimulation. The present application of adaptive DBS (aDBS) technique is primarily based on the detection of increased beta oscillations in the subthalamic nucleus (STN), on account of which it has the capability to change the current depending on the strength of the beta band oscillation, and can, therefore, overcome conventional DBS (cDBS) therapy limitations, including stimulation-induced long term side effects, such as dyskinesia or speech deterioration.

== Future developments ==
New DBS systems are being developed with current steering that allows the application of current in a focal as opposed to a concentric ring around the activated contact. Future DBS electrodes also will have more than four contacts, allowing for finer control of the stimulation area. Segmented contacts have also been developed with each piece having the potential for its own individual stimulation. The manufacturer St Jude is already approved for this for this in Europe and it has FDA approval in the United States. Blinded intraoperative use of directional current with segmented electrodes has been found to have a higher therapeutic window (>41.3%) for STN PD and VIM in essential tremor, as compared to standard omnidirectional stimulation. Boston Scientific has developed leads with eight contacts, each with an independent current source, allowing separate manipulation of DBS parameters (amplitude, frequency, pulse width, and current) at each contact; these have already been approved for use in Europe. Directional current capabilities of the new technology could be more beneficial than simple monopolar settings because they may allow shielding of brain regions with current shaping and steering may be useful to lower the side effects. Potential negatives increased programming time with further programming alternatives, the degree of the programmer's accuracy in "steering" the electrical current to the needed areas and that the decreased surface area due to smaller contacts will increase impedances and increase battery drainage. In essential tremor that is poorly responsive to initial DBS, another set of electrodes was placed in close proximity so that current could be directed from one electrode to the other, has been used as "rescue" therapy for ET; two-electrode system provides greater volume of tissue activation, but more static damage due to second electrode.

Optogenetics is a new technique that may allow activation of neurons using light rather than electricity.

== Mechanism ==
Basal ganglia pathology includes oversynchronization, irregular and rhythmic neuronal discharge, and loss of response selectivity to peripheral stimulation.

The exact mechanism of action of DBS is not completely understood. The overlapping effects of anatomically distinct targets suggest that either there are as many different DBS mechanisms as there are effective targets or there is some common mechanism that is not unique to any particular target. This has led to viewing DBS from a systems perspective of circuit modulation rather than focusing only on its local effects.

Clinical effects of DBS and lesioning are similar, which led to the initial hypothesis that DBS inhibited local neurons through deafferentation. Further investigations suggest its mechanism as more complex than simple inhibition of nuclei. For example, activity is increased in the downstream nuclei during stimulation. The apparent paradox of simultaneous cell body inhibition and axonal activation was explained in part by computational modeling studies demonstrating that under extracellular electrical stimulation, the action potential initiates in the axon. Not only does stimulation serve as an on–off switch for modulating circuit oscillations, but that it also induces synaptic reorganization and alters gene expression.

Other studies have suggested that its benefit occurs through modulation of subcellular compartment processes (for example, the cell body versus its axon) and to change in quality depending on time scale (milliseconds, seconds, days, weeks and months). Applying current to neural elements either activates or inhibits of the surrounding elements. The inhibition of neuronal activity may be secondary to depolarization, neurotransmitter depletion, hyperpolarization, or activation of inhibitory afferent projections. Adjusting the frequency in DBS may also change neuronal discharge threshold, altering the relative population of neurons sending out action potentials.

Mechanistic hypotheses include the following:

1. Depolarization blockade: Electrical currents block the neuronal output at or near the electrode site.
2. Synaptic inhibition: This causes an indirect regulation of the neuronal output by activating axon terminals with synaptic connections to neurons near the stimulating electrode.
3. Desynchronization of abnormal oscillatory activity of neurons
4. Antidromic activation either activating/blockading distant neurons or blockading slow axons. The orthodromic vector is the typical direction of an action potential propagation away from the neuron cell body (soma) towards the axon terminal; its opposite is antidromic. Antidromic activation of deep brain nuclei results in orthodromic activation of cortical neurons.

Electrophysiological studies showed that cortico-basal circuits in chronic neurologic disease are tonically overactive with oversynchronization, irregular and rhythmic neuronal discharge, and loss of selectivity in response to peripheral sensitive stimulation.

Phase amplitude coupling is a measure of how the amplitude of an oscillation in a given frequency band correlates with the phase of another frequency band, a normal process that occurs with functions such as memory, learning, and cognition. In Parkinson's there is an excessive beta-gamma coupling, which, when suppressed by DBS, correlates in magnitude to the degree of clinical improvement.

There is little evidence to suggest that DBS in patients with movement disorders restores normal basal ganglia functions, for example, its roles in movement or learning. Instead, it appears that high-frequency DBS mitigates abnormal basal ganglia output into a more tolerable pattern, helping to restore downstream network function. In support of this theory is the observation that in a normal healthy brain, all basal ganglia connections are inhibitory except for those from the STN.

The STN, the most common nucleus targeted in Parkinson's, integrates motor, cognitive, and emotional information to orchestrate complex behaviors. Furthermore, fMRI studies showed that the STN is involved in emotional processes such as amusement, disgust, sexual arousal, and maternal and romantic love. On fMRI STN-DBS reversed the hypometabolism in motor, associative, and limbic prefrontal areas observed in Parkinson's disease and the diffuse hypermetabolism of the prefrontal cortex. The functional deafferentation of the STN induced by DBS seems to improve executive functions, but reduction of reaction time hastens the decision, which could lead to impulsive and erroneous choices.

DBS disrupts pathologically elevated positive and negative feedback loops in the motor pathway via basal ganglia deafferentation

Histopathologically, the brain parenchyma surrounding the leads develops gliosis over time, and occasionally a microglial infiltrate.

When therapeutic target sites are near areas causing adverse effects, monopolar stimulation, in which the brain is the cathode and the neurostimulator the anode, can be modified to bipolar in which another electrode serves as the anode rather than the neurostimulator, yielding a narrower area of stimulation.

The coordinated reset counteract pathological synchronization processes by providing an antikindling effect and retraining the neural network.

Either there are as many different DBS mechanisms as there are effective targets or there is some common mechanism that is not unique to any particular target. This suggests that it may be profitable to view DBS from a systems perspective rather than just its local effects, an approach that here-to-fore has not been received much consideration.

The electrical effects of clinically applied DBS are strongly influenced by the anisotropic nature of the tissue at the target site in relation to the electrode and can therefore cause heterogeneous electrophysiological, structural, molecular, and cellular reactions. DBS seems to uncouple STN neurons from its axons and cause a functional deafferentation from both efferent and afferent structures.

== History ==
Though DBS was developed in the 1980s, research on electric neurostimulation has a tumultuous history spanning thousands of years. Physicians in ancient Greece considered thunderbolts to be sacred and experimented with medical applications of electrical current. At the same time in dynastic Egypt, electric catfish of the Nile were used to treat migraines. In 46 A.D., Scribonius Largus wrote about the use of electric rays for the treatment of headache.

In 1890, Horsley performed the first extirpation of the motor cortex for treatment of athetosis. Sixty years later, Spiegel described the first stereotactic frame and made lesions in patients with PD to interrupt pallidofugal fibers, causing improvement in bradykinesia, rigidity, and tremor. The 1950s were also when parkinsonism was first treated with ventrolateral thalamic lesions. While attempting to section the cerebral peduncle, a surgeon inadvertently disrupted the anterior choroidal artery and was forced to ligate it, leading to disappearance of rigidity and tremor with preserved motor and sensory function.

In 1963, the first neurostimulation of the thalamic VIM at frequencies of 100–200 Hz improved tremor in patients with parkinsonism. Early pioneers included Carl-Wilhelm Sem-Jacobsen, Natalia Bekhtereva, José Delgado, Robert Heath and Irvine Cooper. Sem-Jacobsen's work was funded by the United States military and criticized for ethical concerns. Similarly, Heath's research faced considerable controversy because of its lack of rigorous scientific method and ethical violations, particularly with regards to informed consent and attempts at conversion therapy. The associated negative publicity, along with the emerging effectiveness of levodopa for Parkinson's after its discovery in 1969, led to a general distaste for electrical neurostimulation and stereotactic surgery in the medical community that lasted until the 21st century.

Alim Louis Benabid and Pierre Pollak heralded the modern era of DBS in 1987 when battery technology and public sentiment had evolved enough to allow manufacture of a portable neurostimulator variant, the addition of a lithium battery allowing it to maintain long term sustained charge. The first application of DBS was to the thalamus in individuals with a history of tremor and prior contralateral thalamotomy.

Though the inhibition of Parkinson's tremor from basal ganglia electrical stimulation had been reliably demonstrated decades before by Bekhtereva in the Soviet Union, Benabid and Pollak were reportedly unaware of this earlier work, with their own discovery of the phenomenon being incidental. They were using electrodes to map out the effects of a planned surgical lesioning for a patient with tremor related to a tumor in the basal ganglia and found that when they electrically stunned tissue around the tumor, the tremor would temporarily disappear.

The surgeons used this observation to construct a device powered by a lithium battery, allowing it to be small enough to be housed entirely within a subcutaneous chest wall pocket and charged by electromagnetic induction. The portability and relative longevity of the device led DBS to gain widespread adaptation.

In 1990, the first models of basal ganglia function were mapped out based on the segregated circuits in its thalamocortical network. During this time pallidotomies were reintroduced for individuals with advanced PD and severe levodopa induced dyskinesia. In 1998, neurostimulation to the STN was first attempted for PD and two years later to the GPi for dystonia.

Over the past two decades, DBS has been researched for surgical treatment of tremor in Parkinson's disease. Michael S. Okun at the University of Florida has recommended the use of a 3T volumetric thin-slice, 1 mm thick MRI sequence, FGATIR (fast gray matter acquisition T1 inversion recovery), for sdelineation of basal ganglia contour to minimize field distortion and recreate the anatomic precision formerly afforded by air based ventriculography.

== Specific DBS targets ==
There are a number of different targets with the procedure, depending on the specific disease and symptomatology. The procedure is FDA approved or has FDA device exemptions for treatment of Parkinson's disease, dystonia, essential tremor, obsessive–compulsive disorder and epilepsy. In Europe, beyond these indications, a CE mark exists for treatment of Alzheimer's Disease. There was a past device exemption for OCD as well but this has not been renewed. Other indications are considered investigational and require Institutional Review Board approval.

The table below summarizes DBS targets and their respective FDA approvals:

Indication	Approval Date	Details	DBS Target	Evidence	Source
Essential Tremor (or Parkinsonian Tremor)	July 31, 1997	Approved for essential tremor.	Ventral intermediate nucleus of the thalamus (VIM)	Significant tremor reduction with thalamic DBS in patients with essential tremor, long-term efficacy and safety.	FDA
Parkinson's Disease	January 14, 2002	Approved for advanced Parkinson's disease symptoms not adequately controlled by medications.	Subthalamic nucleus (STN) or internal globus pallidus (GPi)	DBS in the subthalamic nucleus with better motor function and quality of life compared to best medical therapy.	FDA
Dystonia	April 15, 2003	Humanitarian Device Exemption for the treatment of chronic, intractable primary dystonia, including generalized and segmental dystonia, hemidystonia, and cervical dystonia in individuals seven years of age or above.	Internal globus pallidus (GPi)	Improved motor function in individuals with primary dystonia.	FDA
Obsessive–compulsive disorder	February 19, 2009	Humanitarian Device Exemption for adjunctive treatment of severe, treatment-resistant OCD.	Nucleus Accumbens (NAc)	Reductions in OCD symptoms in severe cases.	FDA
Epilepsy	April 27, 2018	Approved for bilateral stimulation of the anterior nucleus of the thalamus (ANT) as an adjunctive therapy to reduce the frequency of seizures in adults with partial-onset seizures.	Anterior nucleus of the thalamus (ANT)	Significant reduction in seizure frequency in patients receiving DBS.	FDA

== Manufacturers ==
There are multiple major competitors in the current market for stimulators, including Boston Scientific, Medtronic and Abbott, and Newronika. Medtronic and Newronika are the first to develop a closed-loop system based on automatic feedback, though it the technology will likely soon be available on all devices. It is still not approved for clinical usage, however. Abbott has designed a variant that allows remote programming for the patient at home.

== See also ==
- Brain implant
- Brain stimulation reward
- Electroconvulsive therapy
- Neuromodulation (medicine)
- Neuroprosthetics
- Neuroregeneration
- Responsive neurostimulation device
- Transcranial magnetic stimulation
- Temporal interference brain stimulation
- Lead-DBS
