= Temporal interference brain stimulation =

Non-invasive form of deep brain stimulation

Temporal interference brain stimulation (TI) is a non-invasive form of deep brain stimulation (DBS). External electrodes apply high-frequency alternating currents of slightly different frequencies to the brain, and the superposition of the two waves produces a low-frequency envelope. As neurones are responsive to low-frequency electrical signals but not high-frequency signals. TI can use this envelope to focally stimulate deep brain tissues without impacting the overlying and surrounding ones. Since the stimulation strength depends not only on the absolute amplitude but also on the relative amplitude and orientation of the applied fields, this enables precise three-dimensional targeting of deep brain regions.

== Technical details ==
TIS modelled on a bust of the human head – an electric current oscillating at 2010Hz is delivered to the right side of the head and another oscillating at 2000Hz is delivered to the left side. The stimulation target is the right visual cortex, where there is maximal temporal interference between both oscillations; the interfering waveform is visualised on the monitor.

TI stimulation is delivered by using two current sources, which both operate at high frequency with a defined difference in frequency between them. This frequency difference creates an envelope which modulates the target region. Frequencies of operation are typically in the kHz range. The currents are delivered to the scalp using carbon-rubber or silver-silver chloride electrodes. Due to the high frequency and low amplitude of the currents (1–2 mA), there is typically little sensation on the skin compared to other methods, like tACS as the strongest sensations for stimulation frequencies lie in the low frequency range (<4Hz). Traditional transcranial electrical stimulation methods are also limited to targeting of cortical regions only – TI stimulation does not have this limitation and can target deep brain regions as well as cortical regions.

The stimulation strength depends not only on the absolute amplitude but also on the relative amplitude and orientation of the applied fields, which enables precise three-dimensional targeting of deep brain regions.

== Potential applications ==
DBS via implanted electrodes is already used worldwide to treat patients with severe neurological and psychiatric disorders such as Parkinson's disease and Obsessive–compulsive disorder (OCD), and has been investigated as a treatment option for Alzheimer's disease and depression, but its invasiveness makes widespread clinical use and deployment in research impractical. TI has been posited as an alternative treatment to invasive implants for epilepsy patients who are ineligible for resective surgery, or for whom such surgery was unsuccessful.

== Safety ==
Compared to other non-invasive stimulation methods, experiments suggest that adverse effects are generally rare, with just a few incidences of mild common stimulation side effects such as tingling or fatigue. Below certain frequency thresholds, exposure conditions appear to be equivalent to those known to be safe in other stimulation methods.

== History ==
In 2017, Grossman et al. proposed temporal interference stimulation as a non-invasive method for deep brain stimulation, validating TI as a stimulation method in rodents. The concept of TI stimulation was later independently validated by other labs in in-vitro studies, in-vivo rodent and non-human primate studies, and in humans. In 2018, temporal interference brain stimulation received the Science and PINS Prize for Neuromodulation. TI has also garnered coverage in international press as a potential treatment for several brain disorders.

== Limitations ==
TI has a high propensity for shallow brain stimulation as a side effect, and isolated neurons do not respond individually to TI stimulation, but instead respond as part of a network.
