= Responsive neurostimulation device =

Category of medical devices that respond to signals in a patient's body to treat disease

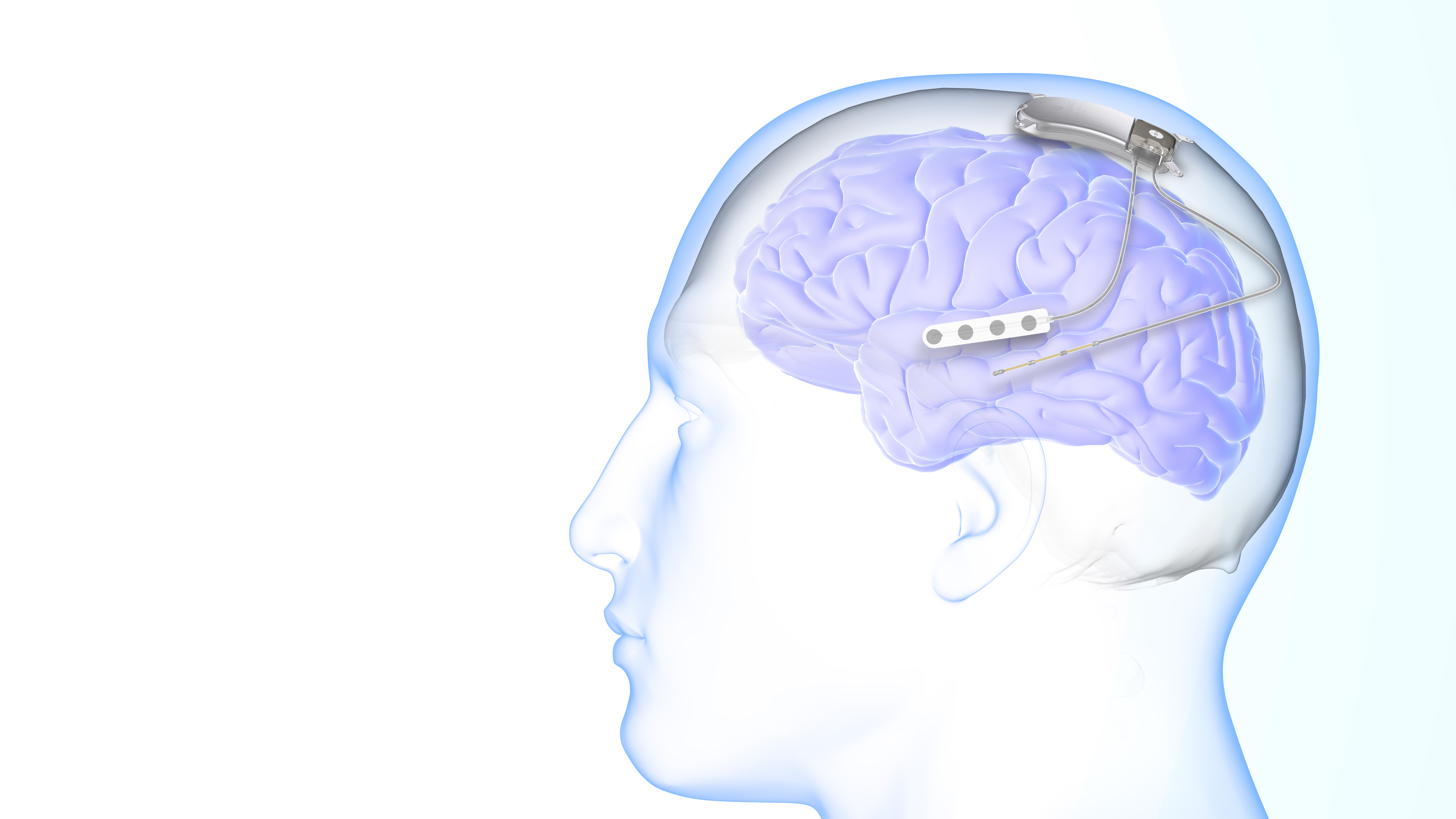
The NeuroPace RNS System used in the treatment of epileptic seizures

Responsive neurostimulation device is a medical device that senses changes in a person's body and uses neurostimulation to respond in the treatment of disease. The FDA has approved devices for use in the United States in the treatment of epileptic seizures and chronic pain conditions. Devices are being studied for use in the treatment of essential tremor, Parkinson's disease, Tourette's syndrome, depression, obesity, and post-traumatic stress disorder.

== Medical uses ==
=== Epilepsy ===
The use of neurostimulation to treat epileptic seizures is only recommended in those who have failed multiple medications for the treatment of their seizures. The NeuroPace RNS system was approved for use by the FDA in 2013 and is the only medical device for epilepsy that uses responsive neurostimulation. The device is surgically implanted into the patient's head with electrical leads placed near the site in the brain that is believed to be the origin of the patient's seizures. These leads record electrical activity in the brain and deliver electrical stimulation when a seizure is detected. The device keeps a record of abnormal electrical activity that is reviewed by a neurologist to improve the detection and treatment of seizures. The patient is able to record when they are having symptoms with the device to see if their symptoms are correlating with seizures. The use of responsive stimulation has found to be effective for seizure reduction. Some patients are able to achieve complete seizure freedom with responsive and non-responsive neurostimulation.

=== Chronic pain ===
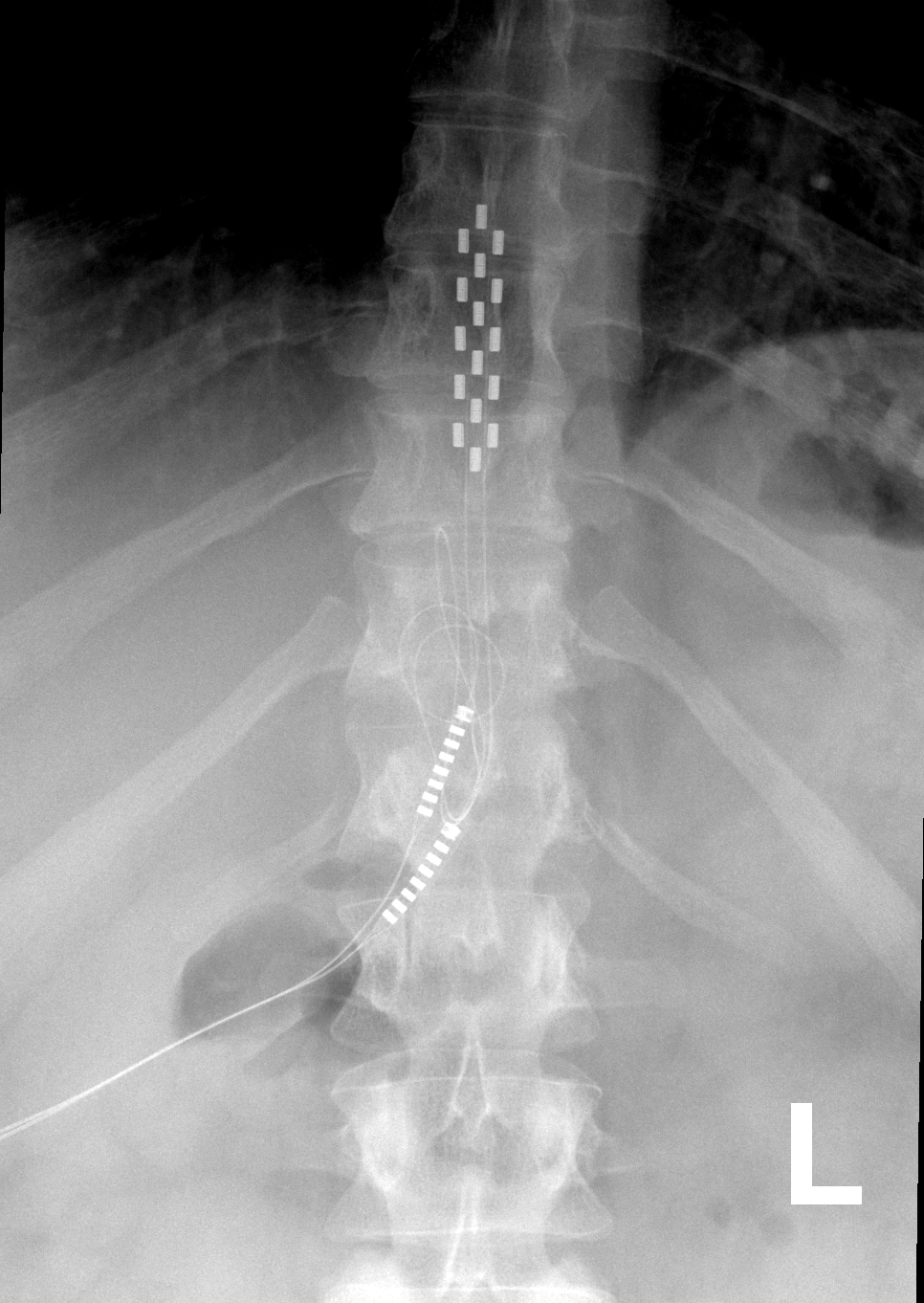
A spinal cord stimulator implanted into the thoracic spine

Neurostimulation for chronic pain is primarily through the use of spinal cord stimulators. These devices deliver electrical stimulation to different areas of the spine based on where they are implanted. Since 2012, Medtronic has produced spinal cord stimulators with accelerometers that can predict the patient's position. The device can be programmed to give additional electrical stimulation if the patient is thought to be in a more painful position.

== Research ==
Reponsive neurostimulation is an active area of research with multiple clinical trials underway. Continuous, or non-responsive, neurostimulation has been FDA approved since 2002 with the introduction of deep brain stimulators for Parkinson's disease. As medical technology has improved, so has our understanding of neural networks and their role in human disease. Adding sensing capabilities to these devices has provided new targets to stimulate and feedback into how to more effectively stimulate the brain. At this time, there are clinical trials for reponsive neurostimulation devices in the treatment of essential tremor, Parkinson's disease, Tourette's syndrome, depression, obesity, and post-traumatic stress disorder.

== See also ==
- Brain implant
- Cranial electrotherapy stimulation
- Electroconvulsive therapy
- Electroencephalography
- Neuromodulation (medicine)
- Neuroprosthetics
- Organization for Human Brain Mapping
- Transcranial direct-current stimulation
- Vagal nerve stimulation
