= Hagai Bergman =

Israeli neurologist (born 1952)

- חגי ברגמן
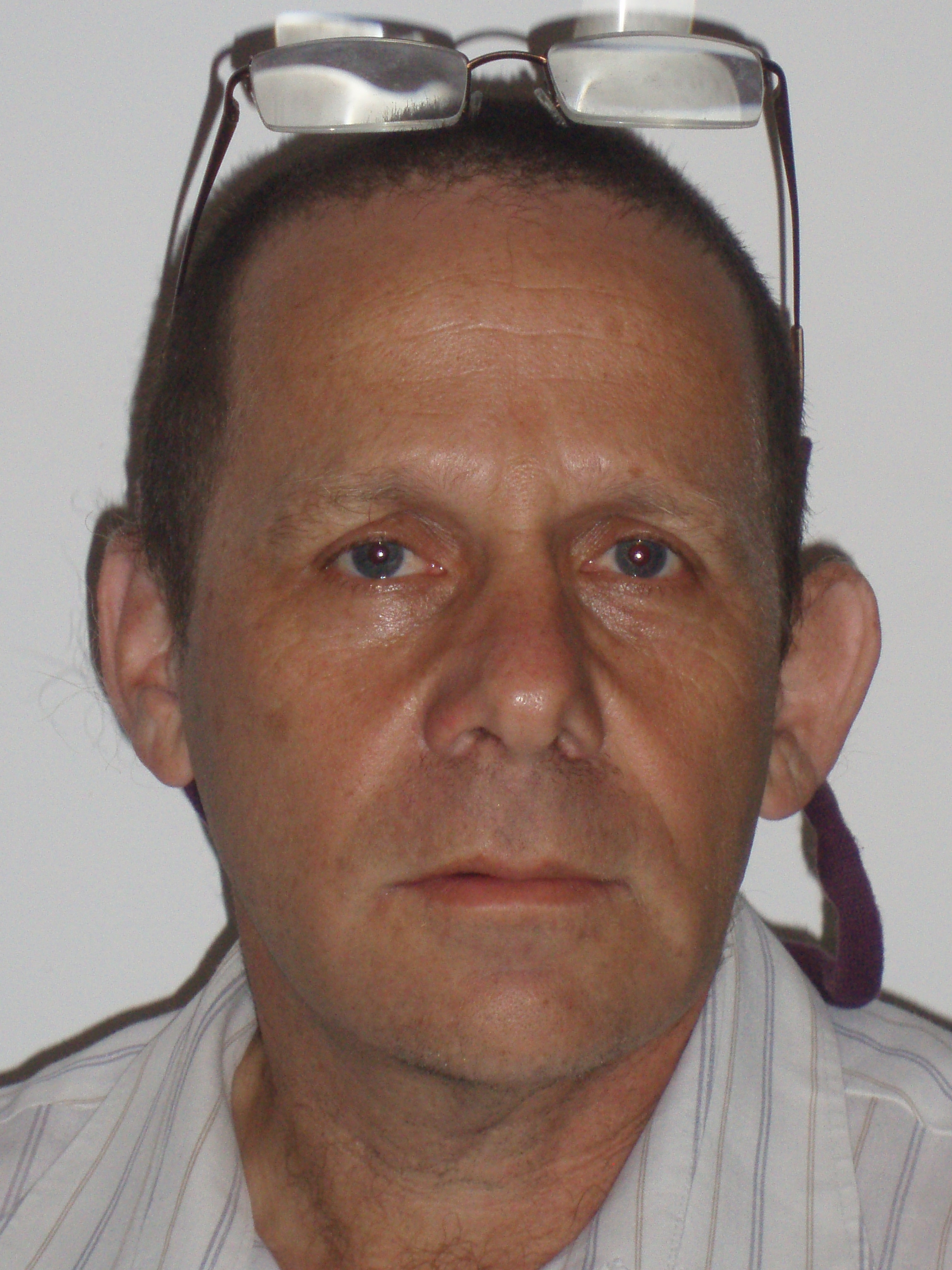
- Born: April 2, 1952 (age 74); Tel Aviv, Israel
- Education: Hebrew University of Jerusalem (B.Sc., M.Sc., M.D., Ph.D.)
- Known for: Research on the basal ganglia and Parkinson's disease
- Awards: Rothschild Prize in Life Sciences (2004); EMET Prize in Life Sciences (2013); International Prize for Translational Neuroscience by the Gertrud Reemtsma Foundation (2019); Israel Prize (2024)
- Scientific career
- Fields: Neuroscience, Physiology
- Workplaces: Hebrew University of Jerusalem

Hagai Bergman (Hebrew: חגי ברגמן; born 1952 in Tel Aviv) is an Israeli neuroscientist best known for his work on the basal ganglia and their involvement in movement disorders, especially Parkinson's disease. He is currently the Simone and Bernard Guttman Chair in Brain Research and Professor of Physiology in the Edmond and Lily Safra Center for Brain Sciences at the Hebrew University of Jerusalem. He received the Israel Prize in Life Sciences Research for the year 2024.

== Early life and education ==
Bergman was born in 1952, in Tel Aviv, Israel. He pursued his early education in physics and mathematics at the Hebrew University of Jerusalem, where he earned a B.Sc. in 1971 and an M.Sc. in 1973. He later transitioned to medicine and physiology, earning his M.D. in 1980 and a Ph.D. in physiology in 1986 from the same institution.

== Career ==
Bergman's research has significantly advanced our understanding of the basal ganglia's function and their implications in neurological diseases. His work has contributed to the development of deep brain stimulation (DBS) as a therapeutic intervention for Parkinson's disease. Bergman's studies have provided insights into the neural mechanisms underlying motor control and the pathological processes leading to movement disorders.

Throughout his career, Bergman has received numerous awards, including the Rothschild Prize in Life Sciences in 2004, the EMET Prize in Life Sciences in 2013, the Rappaport prize in 2013, the International Prize for Translational Neuroscience by the Gertrud Reemtsma Foundation in 2019 and the Israel Prize in 2024. His scientific discoveries have been covered by major international news publications including Scientific American, The Times of Israel.

== Research contributions ==
Bergman's research has focused on several key areas:

- The role of the basal ganglia in normal and pathological motor control
- The pathophysiology of Parkinson's disease and other movement disorders
- The development and optimization of deep brain stimulation (DBS) techniques

His work has led to a deeper understanding of the neural circuits involved in motor control and has had a direct impact on the treatment strategies for Parkinson's disease. Bergman's pioneering studies have paved the way for novel therapeutic approaches, improving the quality of life for patients with movement disorders. While multiple works have contributed to our understanding of the basal ganglia, a key notable contribution may be seen in the paper with Thomas Wichmann and Mahlon DeLong, which was published in 1990 in Science. In it, the team lesioned the subthalamic nucleus in the MPTP primate model of Parkinson's Disease. At the time, lesions to this structure were avoided by neurosurgeons, since it was assumed these would lead to hemiballismus. However, in their experiment, Bergman and colleagues could show that lesioning the subthalamic nucleus led to sudden reversal of multiple cardinal symptoms of Parkinson's Disease, such as tremor. Their study ultimately led to the application of deep brain stimulation to the structure by the team of Alim Louis Benabid and Pierre Pollak in Grenoble. Since then, deep brain stimulation has been applied in over 200,000 patients and has led to significant improvements in motor function and quality of life in people living with Parkinson's Disease. Beyond clinical application, the study helped to empirically prove the theoretical predictions made by the Albin-DeLong model of the basal ganglia.

== Selected publications ==
- Bergman, H., Wichmann, T., & DeLong, M. R. (1990). Reversal of experimental parkinsonism by lesions of the subthalamic nucleus. Science, 249(4975), 1436–1438.
- Bergman, H., & Deuschl, G. (2002). Pathophysiology of Parkinson's disease: From clinical neurology to basic neuroscience and back. Movement Disorders, 17(S3), S28-S40.
- Israelashvili, M., & Bergman, H. (2008). Pathophysiology of the basal ganglia in Parkinson's disease. The Lancet Neurology, 7(8), 795–808.
- Bergman H. The Hidden Life of the Basal Ganglia: At the Base of Brain and Mind. The MIT Press; 2021.
