= Alberto Priori =

Italian neurologist

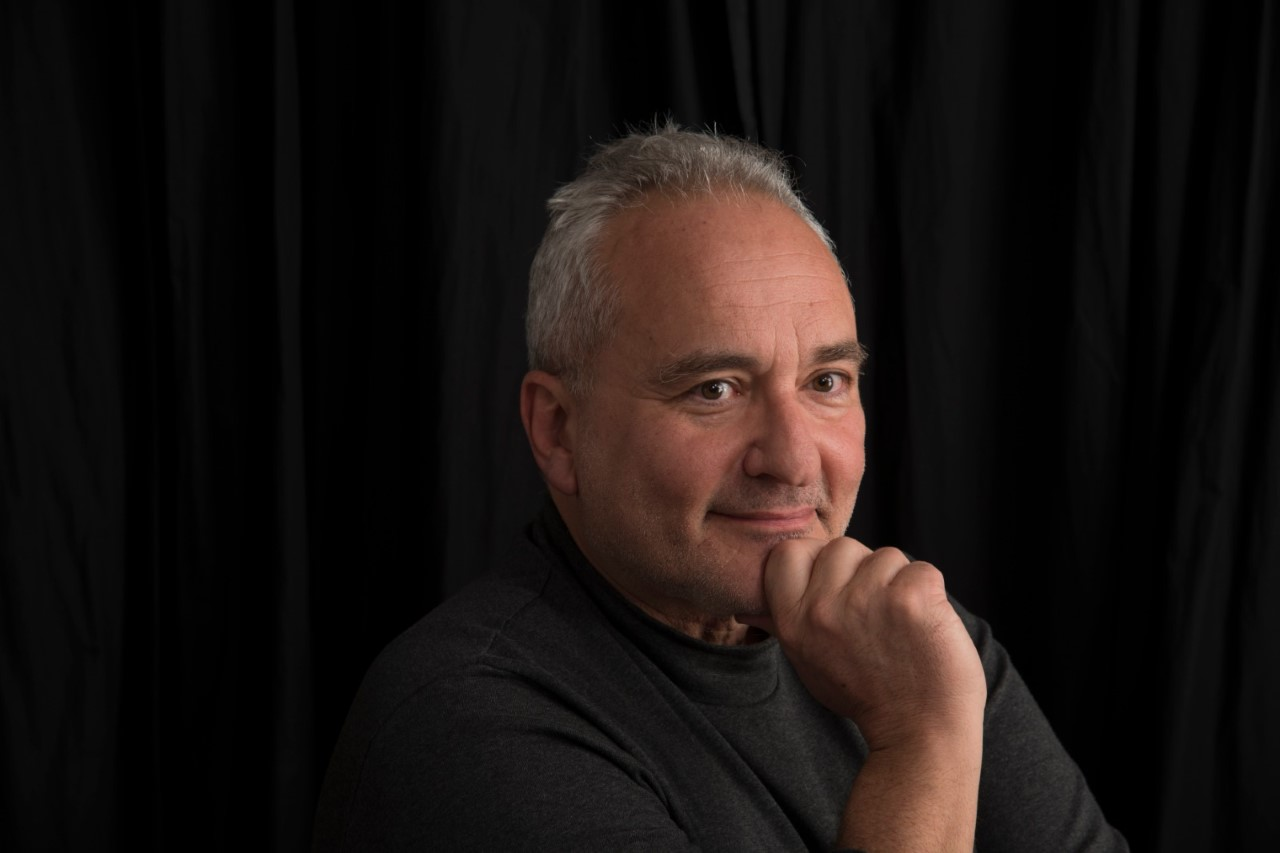
- Born: November 19, 1962 (age 63); Turin, Italy
- Occupations: Neurologist, academic, and author

Academic background
- Education: Degree in Medicine and Surgery; Specialization in Neurology; Doctor of Philosophy (PhD)
- Alma mater: University of Rome "La Sapienza"

Alberto Priori (born November 19, 1962) is an Italian neurologist, academic, and author. He is a professor of Neurology at the University of Milan, Director of Neurology 1 Unit at San Paolo Hospital, and the Founder and Coordinator of Aldo Ravelli Center (Coordinated Research Center) of the University of Milan. He also serves as President of the Neurophysiopatology Techniques Course, and Professor of Postgraduate Schools - Medicine, Healthcare, Dental Medicine at the same university.

Priori is internationally recognized for his wide-ranging research on the pathophysiological mechanisms that underlie diseases of the brain and of the peripheral nervous system. He developed innovative technologies for the treatment of neuropsychiatric disorders, and has also pioneered the implementation of several neuromodulation techniques. In 2008, he founded the Newronika SpA a spin-off company of the University of Milan and Fondazione IRCCS Ca' Granda in Milan, Italy. The company is dedicated to the development of neurotechnological devices for the treatment of neurological disorders.

== Early life and education ==
Priori was born in Turin, Italy in 1962. He studied at the University of Rome "La Sapienza", and got his Degree in Medicine and Surgery in 1987, specialization in Neurology in 1991, and a Doctoral degree in 1995. His dissertation on the non-invasive study of the inhibitory mechanisms in the human cerebral cortex, was supervised by Alfredo Berardelli and Mario Manfredi. From 1997 till 1998, Priori was a Postdoctoral fellow at the University of Rome "La Sapienza."

== Career ==
Priori began his career in 1990, with an appointment as a Research Registrar of Human Movement and Balance Unit at Institute of Neurology at the University of London in the period 1989–1991. From 1992 till 1998, he was appointed as an Attending physician in the Department of Neurology of Ospedale Mellino Mellini di Chiari (BS). Following this, he joined Fondazione IRCCS Cà Granda - Ospedale Maggiore Policlinico of Milan, and served there as a Neurologist from 1998 till 2015, and as a Director from 2008 till 2015. During this time period, he also held a concurrent appointment as an Army Medical Corps Captain.

== Research ==
Priori's research spans the fields of clinical and experimental neurosciences with particular attention on movement disorders and their pathophysiology, clinical and experimental neurophysiology, behavioral neurology, and neuromodulation. With collaboration of clinical neuroscientists, he works extensively to develop technologies for the treatment of neuropsychiatric disorders. He has published over 300 papers. For his research in the field, he has also received several competitive research grants provided by national and international institutes.

=== Adaptive deep brain stimulation (aDBS) ===
Priori led the group who developed, in 2004, and eventually patented, the adaptive deep brain stimulation technique. This technology has been licensed to Newonika. Along with discussing the efficacy of deep brain stimulation (DBS) in terms of treating neurological disorders, Priori has presented a review on the evidences regarding the advantages of neurosignal-controlled aDBS that uses local field potentials (LFPs) as a control variable. His research highlighted how DBS systems automatically adjust stimulation by analyzing the individual patient's condition, and then improve control over parkinsonian disturbances. In 2017, he presented a report on the possible pathways for the clinical translation of aDBS with its benefits, limitations and unsolved issues. He also developed and validated an external portable aDBS system prototype with an application to promote clinical investigations in Parkinson's Disease. Moreover, he discussed the implications of aDBS in the context of providing effective treatment method for the management of clinical fluctuations, as well as controlling levodopa-induced side effects in Parkinsonian patients.

In 2021, he conducted a comparative analysis of the impacts occurred on motor symptoms as a result of conventional deep brain stimulation (cDBS) and closed-loop adaptive deep brain stimulation (aDBS) in patients with Parkinson's Disease. He also presented an implantable closed-loop clinical neural interface, and described its first application in Parkinson's disease.

=== Low intensity transcranial electrical stimulation (TES) ===
Priori is the first to describe a technique now known as transcranial direct current stimulation (tDCS). Lately, he has implemented this technique by developing the methodology for stimulating with non-invasive DC, the cerebellum and the spinal cord. In 2008, he provided the state of the art for tDCS, while highlighting the applications of tDCS in terms of inducing beneficial effects in brain disorders. He regarded brain stimulation with weak direct currents as a promising tool in the context of human neuroscience and neurobehavioral research. In a later study, he presented a comprehensive review to discuss the key challenges that occur in the process of conducting clinical research with transcranial direct current stimulation (tDCS). Having discussed the challenges, he described the evidence-based guidelines on the therapeutic use of transcranial direct current stimulation (tDCS), and low intensity transcranial electric stimulation (TES).

=== Neuropsychiatric impact of COVID-19 pandemic ===
Priori focused his study to explore the long-lasting cognitive abnormalities that can occur in the COVID-19 patients in the months after hospital discharge. In 2020, he provided justifications regarding "The international European Academy of Neurology survey on neurological symptoms in patients with COVID-19 infection." He is of the view that the survey serves to set up a prospective registry to better capture the prevalence of patients with neuro COVID-19, neurological disease characteristics and the contribution of neurological manifestations to outcome. While discussing the psychological implications of the first outbreak of COVID-19 in the context of Italy, he offered several ways to minimize the impact in daily life activities, such as sexuality and nutrition.

== Bibliography ==
=== Monographs ===
- Priori, A. (2021). Priori, Alberto (ed.). Neurology of COVID-19. doi:10.54103/milanoup.57. ISBN 979-12-80325-35-8. PMID 35507705.
- Ferrucci, Roberta; Demartini, Benedetta; Reitano, Maria Rita; Ruggiero, Fabiana; Nisticò, Veronica; Alberto, Priori (2021). Durante un'epidemia. Aspetti psicologici e psicopatologici legati alla pandemia di Covid-19 [During an epidemic: Psychological and psychopathological aspects related to the Covid-19 pandemic] (in Italian). Erickson. ISBN 978-88-590-2541-2.

=== Selected articles ===
- Priori, A.; Berardelli, A.; Inghilleri, M.; Accornero, N.; Manfredi, M. (1994). "Motor cortical inhibition and the dopaminergic system: Pharmacological changes in the silent period after transcranial brain stimulation in normal subjects, patients with Parkinson's disease and drug-induced parkinsonism". Brain. 117 (2): 317–323. doi:10.1093/brain/117.2.317. PMID 8186958.
- Priori, Alberto; Berardelli, Alfredo; Rona, Sabine; Accornero, Neri; Manfredi, Mario (July 1998). "Polarization of the human motor cortex through the scalp". NeuroReport. 9 (10): 2257–2260. doi:10.1097/00001756-199807130-00020. PMID 9694210.
- Priori, Alberto (April 2003). "Brain polarization in humans: a reappraisal of an old tool for prolonged non-invasive modulation of brain excitability". Clinical Neurophysiology. 114 (4): 589–595. doi:10.1016/S1388-2457(02)00437-6. PMID 12686266.
- Priori, Alberto; Lefaucheur, Jean-Pascal (March 2007). "Chronic epidural motor cortical stimulation for movement disorders". The Lancet Neurology. 6 (3): 279–286. doi:10.1016/S1474-4422(07)70056-X. PMID 17303534.
- Priori, Alberto; Foffani, Guglielmo; Rossi, Lorenzo; Marceglia, Sara (July 2013). "Adaptive deep brain stimulation (aDBS) controlled by local field potential oscillations". Experimental Neurology. 245: 77–86. doi:10.1016/j.expneurol.2012.09.013. PMID 23022916.
