= Alexandre-Achille Souques =

French neurologist (1860–1944)

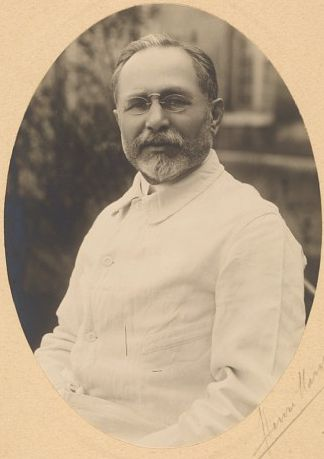
Alexandre-Achille Souques (1860-1944)

Alexandre-Achille Cyprien Souques (6 February 1860 – 24 December 1944) was a French neurologist born in Comprégnac in the département Aveyron.

Souques studied medicine in Paris, where in 1886 he became an interne and in 1891 earned his medical doctorate. Afterwards he worked as médecin des hôpitaux (Hospice de la Salpêtrière), and in 1918 became a member of the Académie de Médecine. With Joseph Babinski (1857-1932) and others, he was a founding member of the Societé de Neurologie de Paris.

He is remembered for his extensive research of Parkinsonism, and in a 1921 treatise titled Rapport sur les syndromes parkinsoniens, he documented the importance of encephalitis lethargica as a cause of Parkinsonism. With his mentor Jean-Martin Charcot (1825-1893), he described the eponymous "Souques-Charcot geroderma", a condition that is a variant of Hutchinson–Gilford disease. Souques is also credited with introducing the term "camptocormia" to describe an abnormal forward-flexed posture.

== Associated eponym ==
- Souques' sign: Involuntary extension and spreading of the fingers when the paretic arm of patient is raised and extended.

== Publications ==
- Infantilism hypophysaire, with Stéphen Chauvet (1885-1950). In Nouvelle iconographie de la Salpêtrière, Paris, 1913, 26: 69–80.
- Rapport sur les syndromes parkinsoniens. In Revue Neurologique, Paris, 1921, 28: 534–573.
- Kinésie paradoxale. In Revue Neurologique, Paris, 1921, 37: 559–560.
