= Pleurothotonus =

- Other names: Pisa syndrome

Pleurothotonus, commonly known as Pisa syndrome, is a rare neurological disorder which occurs due to prolonged exposure to antipsychotic drugs (which may also be referred to as neuroleptics). It is characterized by dystonia, and abnormal and sustained involuntary muscle contraction. This may cause twisting or jerking movements of the body or a body part. Although Pisa syndrome develops most commonly in those undergoing long-term treatment with antipsychotics, it has been reported less frequently in patients receiving other medications, such as an acetylcholinesterase inhibitor. However, it has also been seen in those with other diseases causing neurodegeneration and in those who are not receiving any medication (idiopathic Pisa syndrome). The characteristic development of Pisa syndrome consists of two types of dystonia: acute dystonia and tardive dystonia (also known as tardive dyskinesia). The underlying pathology of drug-induced Pisa syndrome is very complex, and development may be due to an underlying dopaminergic-cholinergic imbalance, or serotonergic/noradrenergic dysfunction.

== Symptoms ==
The predominant symptom of Pisa syndrome is dystonia. Dystonia is a neurological movement disorder characterized by sustained muscle contraction leading to abnormal posture, twisting, and repetitive movement. In Pisa Syndrome specifically there is commonly a tonic flexion of the trunk of the body to one side, leading to a slight lean (reminiscent of the Leaning Tower of Pisa, hence the name "Pisa syndrome"). To be classified as Pisa syndrome, there must be a constant lateral curve of the spine, without any evidence of rotation in the spinal bones. This is usually associated with a backward axial rotation of the spine and indifferent to markedly abnormal posture. Patients diagnosed with Pisa Syndrome usually experience either acute dystonia or tardive dystonia, also known as tardive dyskinesia. Differential diagnosis between the two may be hard to accomplish without a complete patient history, since both types of dystonia may occur simultaneously in a patient. These symptoms generally disappear after discontinuation of the antipsychotic drug. The time of onset of symptoms may vary depending on drug being administered and the neurological characteristics of the patient in question.

=== Acute dystonia ===
Acute dystonia nearly always develops a few weeks after a dopamine blocking agent/medication has begun or a substantial increase in antipsychotic dosage. An acute dystonic reaction consists of sustained, painful muscular spasms, producing twisting of the trunk/body and abnormal posture. The most frequent occurrences of these spasms have been reported in the neck, tongue, and jaw. Oculogyric crisis and opisthotonus are also very common. Acute effects of dopamine antagonists also include Parkinsons-like symptoms, manifested by bradykinesia, pin rolling tremor, and rigidity of the body. These movements may fluctuate over hours and temporarily dissipate in response to reassurance, and the individual episodes may last minutes to hours. Acute reactions are more common in older patients and females. The pathophysiology underlying these reactions is unknown, but the movements usually occur during the period when blood medication level is dropping. The acute syndromes which occur due to prolonged exposure to a dopamine antagonist are collectively termed extrapyramidal symptoms, EPS.

=== Tardive dyskinesia ===
Tardive dyskinesias are involuntary movements of the lips, tongue, face, trunk, and extremities which occur in patients with prolonged exposure to dopamine antagonists or antipsychotic medications. Clinical findings have provided evidence that adenosine, a major inhibitory neurotransmitter in the central nervous system, plays a role in the development of tardive dykinesias. Tardive dykinesias have also been associated with polymorphism in the dopamine receptor D2 gene, dopamine receptor D3 gene, dopamine transporter (DAT) gene, and manganese superoxide dismutase (MnSOD) gene. Tardive dyskinesias are chronic compared to acute dystonia, which occur in an episodic fashion.

Importantly, non-Pisa tardive dyskinesia does not subside after reducing or stopping medication.

== Prevalence ==
There are not clear diagnostic criteria for Pisa syndrome, making it difficult to accurately measure prevalence of the disease. Furthermore, the symptoms of Pisa syndrome are often overlooked or mistaken for other syndromes or conditions. Different studies from 1991 to 2023 have estimated the prevalence as low as 0.037% and as high as 15%, depending on the populations surveyed, with the highest prevalence being in patients with Parkinson's Disease who developed dopaminergic drug-induced Pisa syndrome.

== Causes ==
Pisa syndrome is predominantly caused by a prolonged administration or an overly dosed administration of antipsychotic drugs. Although antipsychotic drugs are known to be the main drugs that are concerned with this syndrome, several other drugs are reported to have caused the syndrome as well. Certain antidepressants, psychoactive drugs, and antiemetics have also been found to cause Pisa syndrome in patients.

Drugs found to have caused Pisa Syndrome:

- Atypical antipsychotic drugs- ex. clozapine, aripiprazole
- Tricyclic antidepressants- ex. clomipramine
- Psychoactive drugs
- Antiemetic drugs
- Cholinesterase inhibitors, specifically acetylcholinesterase inhibitors
- Galantamine
- Various other drugs at low incidence

Based on the drugs that caused Pisa syndrome, it has been implicated that the syndrome may be due to a dopaminergic-cholinergic imbalance or a serotonergic or noradrenergic dysfunction. For the development of Pisa syndrome that cannot be alleviated by anticholinergic drugs, it has been considered that asymmetric brain functions or neural transmission may be the underlying mechanism. How these drugs interact with the biochemistry of the brain to cause the syndrome is unknown and a topic of current research.

== Risk factors ==
Typically, females and older patients with organic brain changes are more likely to develop Pisa syndrome. Organic brain changes are physical changes in the brain which lead to neurological dysfunction, including dementia and frontal lobe syndrome. This includes the presence of neurodegenerative illnesses such as Alzheimer's disease and Parkinson's disease.

A prospective study has also shown that cocaine use increased the incidence of Pisa syndrome, especially in conjunction with chronic neuropsychiatric drug treatment.

== Treatment and Medication ==
There are two lines of treatment for Pisa syndrome. The first line entails discontinuation or reduction in dose of the antipsychotic drug(s). The second line of treatment is an anticholinergic medication. A pharmacological therapy for Pisa syndrome caused by prolonged use of antipsychotic drugs has not been established yet.

=== Reduction of drug dosage ===
Reducing the dosage of the antipsychotic drugs resulted in gradual improvement in the abnormal posture. In some cases, discontinuing the use of those drugs resulted in complete disappearance of the syndrome. The time it took for the improvement and the disappearance of the syndrome depended on the type of drug being administered or the specific cause of the syndrome itself. However, some patients do not recover, and instead experience worsening symptoms after discontinuation of the drug.

=== Anticholinergic drugs ===
Anticholinergic drugs have been reported to be extremely effective in 40% of the patients with the Pisa syndrome. When Pisa syndrome does not respond to anticholinergic drugs, the patient may have permanent brain damage, or have other peripheral causes of Pisa syndrome. While the specific pathology underlying idiopathic Pisa syndrome is unknown, the administration of anticholinergic drugs has provided resolution in known cases, and is the most frequently reported treatment method.

== History ==
Pisa syndrome was discovered by Karl Axel Ekbom, a Swedish neurologist, in the early 1970s. Cases of the syndrome were first observed in three elderly female patients with presenile dementia. Each of these women were undergoing treatment with the antipsychotic drug methylperone, haloperidol or a combination of the two. The use of neuroleptic drugs caused the patients to exhibit a lateral flexion along with a rotation of the trunk. As the patients walked they experienced an increase in rotation. The postural and gait disturbances symptoms is what set this apart from any other form of acute dystonia previously observed. These symptoms proved to be the making of a new dystonic reaction, which was termed pleurothotonus or Pisa syndrome.

The first patient, a 59-year-old woman with no family history of neuroleptic disease, was put through two periods of treatment with methylperone. The first trial of the drug was administered in February 1971. In the beginning the patient demonstrated no symptoms of dystonia. However, within the first few days the patient began to exhibit a tilting to right upon walking. The women was then taken off the methylperone treatment and as a result progressively regressed back to her previous state of exhibiting no symptoms within the first two months. The patient started a second trial of methylperone treatment in late October 1971. After a little over a week of the drug treatment, she began to express previous symptoms that including a bending of the trunk towards the right along with a rotation. The patient also experienced a pulling away from her direction of walking and a difficulty of turning. Within a couple of days of exhibiting symptoms, the patient was then treated with orphenadrine. This treatment helped regress the expressed symptoms quicker than the first time. By the end of the week the patient was able to return to her normal state.

The second patient to undergo methylperone treatment was a 63-year-old woman with presenile dementia, which caused her to experience restlessness and paranoid hallucinations. The methylperone treatment was able to alleviate the woman's problems induced by her dementia. It did not take long for the woman to begin to experience symptoms of Pisa syndrome and as a result she was taken off of the methylperone treatment. Like the first patient, she was able to overcome the induced symptoms of Pisa syndrome within a month. The patient was again treated with methylperone after two months from the first treatment. Soon after the patient began to lean toward the right when standing or walking. She was then administered orphenadrine, which soon stopped the patient's tilting posture.

The final patient was a 69-year-old woman, diagnosed with presenile dementia after she expressing symptoms of memory dysfunction, depression and urinary incontinence. As a result, the woman was put under a methylperone treatment, which soon caused a bending and rotation to her left. These symptoms disappeared soon after being taken off of methylperone. Unlike the other two patients, when the woman was again administered methylperone she did not exhibit any previous dystonic symptoms after two weeks of treatment. The patient was then switched to a small dosage of haloperidol along with the typical dosage of orphenadrine used on the previous patients. Instead of not having symptoms of Pisa syndrome, the woman began to experience a leaning to her left side and a particular rotation of her shoulder towards the left. Once haloperidol was eliminated from the treatment the patient no longer had these symptoms.

As more cases of the syndrome came about, research discovered that the switching of drug treatments can be debated as a possible inducer of the disease. Other cases of the disease have been proven to be caused by medications other than neuroleptic drugs. These patients were observed exhibiting symptoms of Pisa syndrome as a result of having a prior neurodegenerative disease.

== Further research ==
Current research has been focusing on discovering the underlying mechanisms of Pisa syndrome, since little is known about the biological and pharmacological reasons Pisa syndrome occurs (although theories about dopaminergic dysfunction have been suggested). While Pisa syndrome is mostly associated with antipsychotic drugs, there have been incidents of idiopathic Pisa Syndrome, the development of Pisa syndrome in those with other neurological disorders, and Pisa syndrome in those with intellectual disability. Future research aims to pinpoint the essential neurological disorder or disorders underlying the development of Pisa syndrome so more that more effective medication and treatment may be created and/or administered.

== See also ==
- Dystonia
- Opisthotonus
- Camptocormia
- Tardive dyskinesia
- Multiple system atrophy
