= Camptocormia =

Symptom, also called "bent spine syndrome"

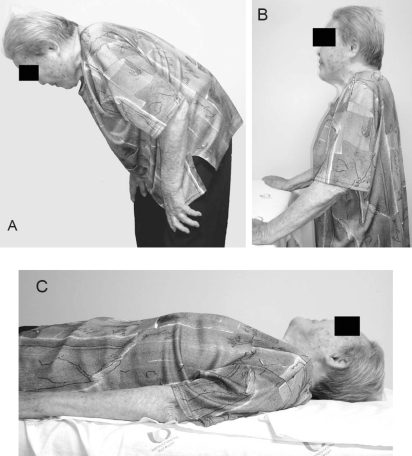
A clinical photograph showing a patient with the flexed posture. It can be abated when lying down.

Camptocormia, also known as bent spine syndrome (BSS), is a symptom of a multitude of diseases that is most commonly seen in the elderly. It is identified by an abnormal thoracolumbar spinal flexion, which is a forward bending of the lower joints of the spine, occurring in a standing position. In order to be classified as BSS, the anterior flexion (the lower back bending) must reach 45 degrees anteriorly. This classification differentiates it from a similar syndrome known as kyphosis. Although camptocormia is a symptom of many diseases, there are two common origins: neurological and muscular. Camptocormia is treated by alleviating the underlying condition causing it through therapeutic measures or lifestyle changes.

== History and society ==
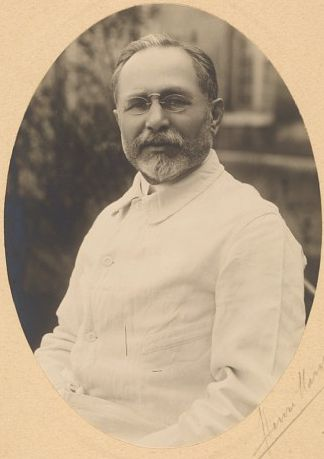
Alexandre-Achille Souques was one of the first major researchers of camptocormia and created the definition and name used for the condition to this day.

Camptocormia comes from two Greek words, meaning "to bend" (κάμπτω, kamptō) and "trunk" (κόρμος, kormos), and was coined by Alexandre-Achille Souques and B. Rosanoff-Saloff. These two men also created the definition of the disease that is widely accepted today.

When the disorder was first clinically studied around the time of First World War, it was believed to be a psychogenic conversion disorder that resulted from the severe trauma of war. Souques and others treated patients with psychological therapy and early versions of electrotherapy. Samuel A. Sandler used a similar approach to treat soldiers during the Second World War. The view of BSS as a conversion disorder led to a lack of awareness about the conditions and few diagnoses by physicians.

As time progressed and advances were made in knowledge of neuroscience and physiology, biological mechanisms behind the irregular bending were identified. The current medically preferred term for the condition is bent spine syndrome, because of the psychological origin associated with camptocormia.

=== Camptocormia in the elderly ===
BSS is not limited to the elderly but has an average age of onset of 66 years and is more common amongst men.

== Symptoms ==
The primary symptom of camptocormia is abnormal forward bending of the torso. This bending becomes worse while walking but does not appear when the affected individual is lying down in a horizontal position. This alleviation of the condition indicates that it is a manifestation of another disease or ailment and is not due to a spine that is actually bent. This is somewhat ironic, since the medically accepted name for the condition is bent spine syndrome.

In an affected individual, the abnormal bending consists of an anterior flexion greater than 45 degrees. Because of this bending and the physical limitations caused by the conditions associated with the disease, it is usually impossible for an affected person to achieve a fully erect position. In addition, patients with camptocormia often experience low back pain as a result of the condition. BSS often appears in individuals with Parkinson's disease, muscular dystrophies, endocrine disorders, inflammatory conditions (myositis), or mitochondrial myopathies. As previously mentioned, the disease is more common in older individuals.

== Pathology ==
When initially identified, camptocormia was classified as a psychogenic disease. Although the condition is sometimes a psychogenic manifestation, camptocormia typically originates from either muscular or neurological diseases. However, due to the wide variety of pathologies resulting in camptocormia, there is no singular cause that is most influential for the condition.

=== Muscular origin ===
Myopathic origin BSS can be secondary to various muscular disorders or occur as a primary idiopathy. These etiologies are termed secondary and primary BSS respectively. Idiopathic primary BSS is a late-onset myopathy with progressive muscular weakness that is detected on the spinal extensor muscles in elderly patients and is more predominant in females. The pathogenesis of primary BSS is typically related to fibrosis and fatty infiltration of muscular tissues and to mitochondrial changes due to the aging process. Specifically, weakening occurs in the paravertebral muscles of patients. These paravertebral muscles have a great influence over the walking stance and gait of a patient, so fatty infiltration and degradation of these muscle lead to the characteristics that easily define BSS, such as the anterior flexion of the back combined with an ability to keep upright with any kind of support (e.g., holding onto a table).

Secondary BSS can have a multitude of causes, making it hard to pinpoint to a specific muscular disorder. Some examples of diseases that have secondary BSS as a symptom are myopathies caused by muscular dystrophies, neuromuscular disorders, and inflammatory muscle diseases; metabolic or endocrine disorders; and mitochondrial myopathies.

=== Neurological origin ===
A multitude of neurological disorders cause BSS, including motor neuron disease, CNS disorders, and early amyotrophic lateral sclerosis. Usually, the bent spine is caused by dysfunctioning extensor spinal muscles with a neurological cause.

Neurological origin BSS may also result from damage to the basal ganglia nuclei that are a part of the cerebral cortex, which play a major role in bodily positioning. Damage to this part of the brain can inhibit proper flexion and extension in the muscles necessary for maintaining an upright position. Additionally, the neurotransmitter dopamine plays a key role in the operation of basal ganglia. An abnormally low dopamine concentration, such as that associated with Parkinson's disease, causes dysfunction in the basal ganglia and the associated muscle groups, leading to BSS. Studies have estimated the prevalence of BSS in people affected by Parkinson's to be between 3% and 18%.

=== Gene mutations ===
Several gene mutations have been identified in patients with camptocormia. These include the RYR1 gene in axial myopathy, the DMPK gene in myotonic dystrophy, and genes related to dysferlinopathy and Parkinson's disease. These genes could serve as targets for gene therapy to treat the condition in the years to come.

== Diagnosis ==
In order to qualify a patient's condition as BSS, the bending angle must be greater than 45 degrees. While the presence of the condition is very easy to note, the cause of the condition is much more difficult to discern. Conditions not considered to be BSS include vertebral fractures, previously existing conditions, and ankylosing spondylitis. Lower-back CT scans and MRIs can typically be used to visualize the cause of the disease. Further identification of the cause can be done by histochemical or cellular analysis of muscle biopsy.

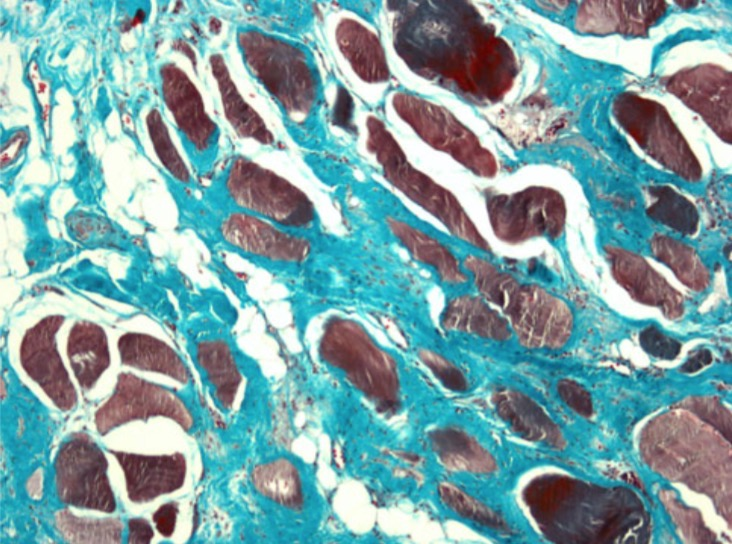
Spinal-muscle biopsy showing intense endomysial deposit of fibrosis (green) and fatty infiltration. Also observable is irregular distribution of involuted muscle fibers. (Trichrome, original magnification ×9100)

Camptocormia is being increasingly found in patients with Parkinson's disease. The diagnosis of Parkinson's-associated camptocormia includes the use of imaging of the brain and the spinal cord, along with electromyography or muscle biopsies.

Muscle biopsies are also a useful tool to diagnose camptocormia. Muscle biopsies found to have variable muscle fiber sizes and even endomysial fibrosis may be markers of bent spine syndrome. In addition, disorganized internal architecture and little necrosis or regeneration is a marker of camptocormia.

Patients with camptocormia present with reduced strength and stooped posture when standing due to weakened paraspinous muscles (muscles parallel to the spine). Clinically, limb muscles show fatigue with repetitive movements. Paraspinous muscles undergo fat infiltration. Electromyography may be used as well in diagnosis. On average, the paraspinous muscles of affected individuals were found to be 75% myopathic, while limb muscles were 50% percent myopathic. Creatine kinase activity levels in skeletal muscle are a diagnostic indicator that can be identifiable through blood tests.

== Treatment ==
=== Treatment and management ===
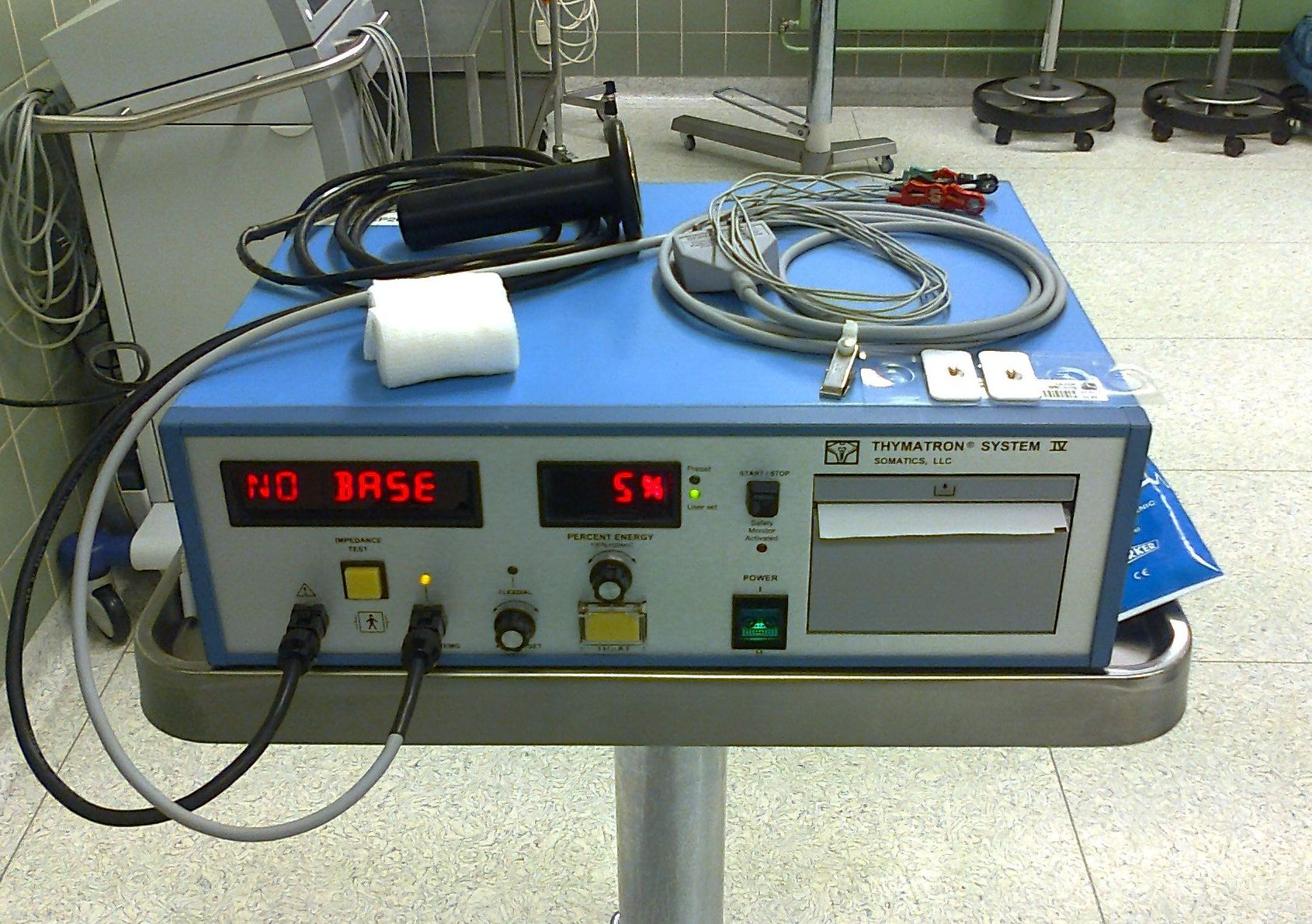
Thymatron IV used for electroconvulsive therapy

Due to the wide range of causes of camptocormia, there is no one treatment that suits all patients. In addition, there is no specific pharmacological treatment for primary BSS. The use of analgesic drugs depends entirely on the intensity of the back pain. Muscular-origin BSS can be alleviated by positive lifestyle changes, including physical activity, walking with a cane, a nutritious diet, and weight loss. Worsening of symptoms is possible but rare in occurrence.

Treatment of the underlying cause of the disease can alleviate the condition in some individuals with secondary BSS. Other treatment options include drugs, injections of botulinum toxin, electroconvulsive therapy, deep brain stimulation, and surgical correction. Unfortunately, many of the elderly individuals affected by the BSS are not treated surgically due to age-related physical ailments and the long postoperative recovery period.

== Prognosis ==
This condition can lead to excess pressure on the spine, causing pain and discomfort. If the spine is bent too far, a patient may have difficulties breathing because of the pressure of the spine pressed against the lungs. Camptocormia may also lead to muscle weakness in the upper back and to arthritis and other bone-degeneration diseases. Because of loss of bone strength, injury to the spine and slipped discs become increasingly significant. Camptocormia can lead to infection, tumors, and diseases of the endocrine system and connective tissues. The success of the treatment method is largely dependent on the patient, but response to therapeutic methods is generally low.

== Research directions ==
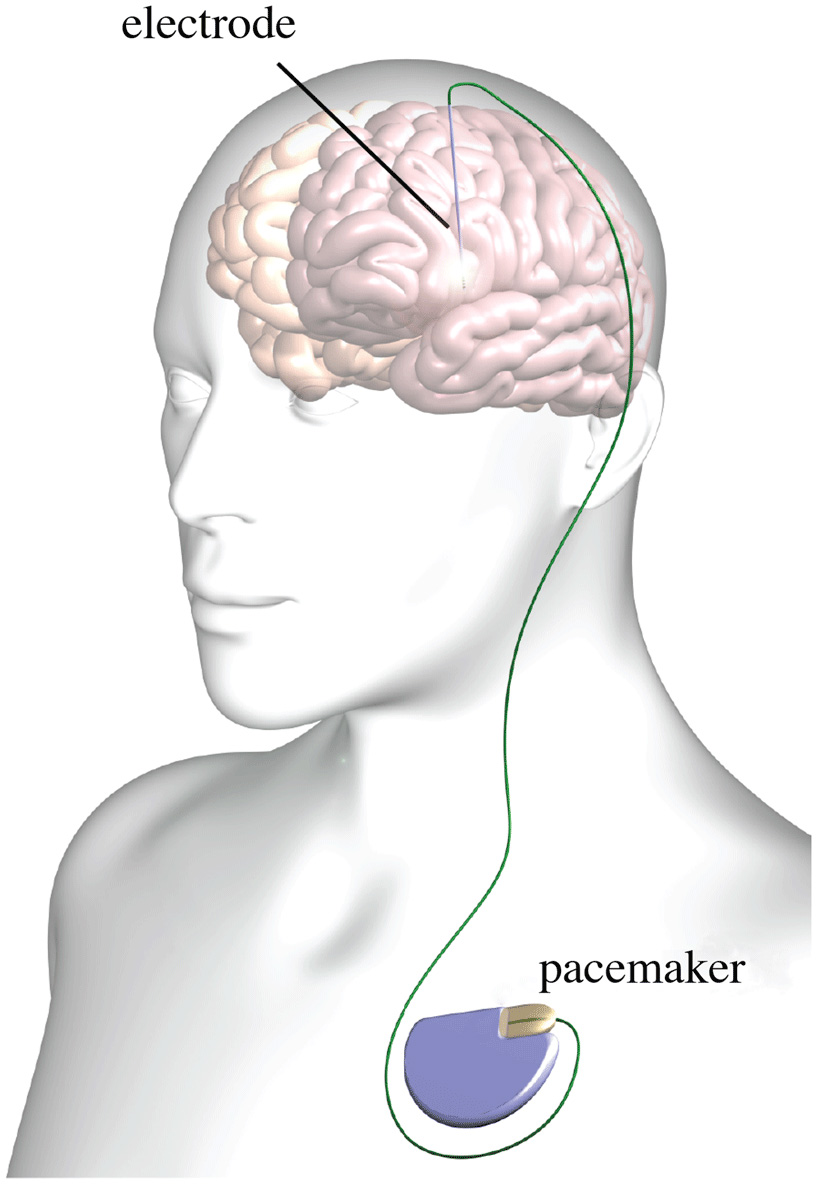
Typical deep brain stimulation setup

Clinical studies have revealed that camptocormia may be hereditary; however, the inheritance mechanism remains unclear. Current areas of research include molecular and genetic studies aimed at elucidating a possible inheritance model along with molecular pathological mechanisms and proteins responsible for BSS. This research will help will facilitate improvement in the classification, diagnosis, and treatment of the condition. In addition, new technologies and animal models of postural abnormalities are being developed to understand camptocormia and design more effective treatment methods.

=== Deep brain stimulation ===
One treatment methodology that is very promising for the treatment of camptocormia is deep brain stimulation. Previously, deep brain stimulation and bilateral stimulation of the subthalamic nucleus and/or globus pallidus internus have been used to treat patients with Parkinson's disease. Studies have shown that similar treatments could be used on patients with severe camptocormia. By using the Burke-Fahn-Marsden Dystonia Rating Scale before and after treatment, it was found that patients experienced significant functional improvement in the ability to walk.
