= Surgical extirpation =

Surgical extirpation is a type of occasionally invasive surgical procedure in which an organ or tissue is completely removed or eradicated. Extirpation is used in the treatment of various medical conditions and also as a means to prevent the spread of cancer.

== Types of extirpation ==
Extirpation of the appendix, or appendectomy, is the standard treatment utilized in cases of acute appendicitis. Approximately 300,000 individuals in the United States have their appendix removed each year.

Extirpation of the colon, or colectomy, is used in the treatment of patient's ulcerative colitis whose condition is resistant to other therapies. In many cases, the removal of the colon may entirely cure the disease. A colectomy may also be utilized in the treatment of colon cancer.

Extirpation of the gallbladder, known as a cholecystectomy, may be used as a treatment for recurrent gallstones or cholecystitis. This type of procedure is typically elective and outcomes following the procedure are typically good. The rate of cholecystectomies being performed on patients with cholecystitis has increased markedly since the first laparoscopic procedure was performed in 1985; jumping from 2.2% in 1996 to 31.4% in 2008.
