= Non-invasive brain stimulation =

Medical treatment

Non-invasive brain stimulation (NIBS) – or Non-invasive cerebellar stimulation (NICS) – is the application of non-invasive neurostimulation techniques on the cerebellum to modify its electrical activity. Techniques such as transcranial magnetic stimulation (TMS) or transcranial direct current stimulation (tDCS) can be used. The cerebellum is a high potential target for neuromodulation of neurological and psychiatric disorders due to the high density of neurons in its superficial layer, its electrical properties, and its participation in numerous closed-loop circuits involved in motor, cognitive, and emotional functions.

Cerebellar TMS is a relatively new field that is undergoing experimental research. A review of scientific literature (2024) has identified hypotheses of underlying processes of different non-invasive neurostimulation techniques. Data analysis revealed that mitochondrial activity plays a central role in all of them. This insight and findings from an analysis of the mother-fetus neurocognitive model constituted the hypothesis of natural brain stimulation. According to this hypothesis, the interactions within the mother-fetus bio-system of acoustic waves, electromagnetic fields, and chemical interactions synchronize their brain oscillations, affecting neuroplasticity in the fetus. At the same time, ecological dynamics during the mother's intentional acts provide a clue to the fetus's nervous system, linking synaptic activity with appropriate stimuli. These processes enable the child's nervous system to evolve with adequate biological sentience. During pregnancy, the mother's body produces this set of physical interactions that provide natural neurostimulation to form the balanced nervous system in the child. Therefore, the balanced architecture of the child's nervous system appears with specific cognitive functions, contributing to the beginning of cognition. It is thought that existing neurostimulation techniques are just exceptional cases of this universal natural sequence of actions, a part of a natural flow of physical interactions in nervous system development during pregnancy. However, there is not yet sufficient evidence of the therapeutic effects of cerebellar TMS, although some successful results have been reported in other clinical studies of TMS used to treat the frontal lobe.

NICS is a neural modulation technique, showing capability to rehabilitate the brain functions of patients undergoing a plethora of neurological or psychiatric diseases. There are 3 forms of NICS which are primarily used; transcranial magnetic stimulation (TMS), transcranial direct current stimulation (tDCS) and transcranial alternating current stimulation (tACS). NICS targets the cerebellum, due to the high density of neurons at its superficial layer (the cerebellar cortex), the electrical properties, and network to neural circuits (involved in motor, cognitive, and emotional functions). Due to the success of clinical trials in response to rehabilitating sensorimotor functions and cognition, more money is being invested in NICS research. NICS has the potential to attack multiple neurological and psychiatric disorders, although NICS is still not included and heavily advocated in clinical treatment. This is due to contingent conclusions regarding NICS effects. Further research is still required to confirm and identify the optimal parameters to target these regions.

== Existing NIBS methods ==
Non-invasive brain strimulation is an umbrella term that encompasses a number of techniques that attempt to affect the brain for therapeutic effect.

Non-invasive electroceutical neurostimulation encompasses five approaches:

- Photonic neurostimulation through the image-forming vision pathways and skin irradiation. This technique is known as Light therapy, and also known as Phototherapy or Luxtherapy. It refers to the body's exposure to intensive electrical light at managed wavelengths to treat different diseases.
- Transcranial laser radiation refers to directional low-power and high-fluence monochromatic or quasimonochromatic light radiation, also known as photobiomodulation (PBM).
- Transcranial electric current and magnetic field stimulations;
- Low-frequency sound stimulations, including vibroacoustic therapy (VAT) and rhythmic auditory stimulation (RAS).
- Acoustic photonic intellectual neurostimulation (APIN). It applies features of natural neurostimulation during pregnancy scaled on specific patients. Three therapeutic agents cause oxygenation of neuronal tissues, release of adenosine-5′-triphosphate proteins, and neuronal plasticity. This method shows significant results in chronic pain management in various conditions.

The three most distinguished NICS methods include transcranial magnetic stimulation (TMS), transcranial direct-current stimulation (tDCS) and transcranial alternating current stimulation (tACS). All methods involve the targeting to the cerebellar region of interest. However collectively the effects of these treatments are not fully disclosed. Multiple theories have been suggested; 1) NICS influences the excitability of cerebellar neurons and in the connectivity between cerebellar and other brain regions, which henceforth alters the cerebellums motor and cognitive functions. 2) NICS can induce variations in plasticity (ability of nervous system to adapt its activity in response to stimuli), which create long-lasting effects behaviour and cognition. 3) NICS induces selectivity of the activation and/or inhibition of specific neural circuits within the cerebellum.

=== Transcranial magnetic stimulation (TMS) ===
TMS utilises a magnetic field to induce a brief electrical impulse which stimulates neurons within the cerebral cortex. This targets the cerebral cortex through electromagnetic induction. Its general mechanism is applying a magnetic field in the form of coil to the scalp which then influences your motor cortex. TMS itself has variations in terms of magnet strength, pulse frequency, pulse patterns (rTMS), magnetic coil type and stimulation target. Depending on its target use, these factors can be manipulated specific to the target disease. This is a method which is FDA approved and primarily utilized for mental illnesses such as depression.

=== Transcranial direct current stimulation (tDCS) ===
tDCS involves the application of a weak direct electrical current to the scalp which flows through underlying brain tissue and modulates the activity of the neurons within the targeted region. When directed on the cerebellum, tDCs can increase or suppress the excitability of neurons. This is the dependent on the current; an anode is placed on the target region and a cathode on the reference region, I.e. excitability of neurons is enhanced in the target region and alternatively suppressed in the reference region.

=== Transcranial alternating current stimulation (tACS) ===
tACS involves the utilisation of an alternating current on the target region which is stated to modulate activity of brain regions through entraining neuronal oscillations and hence enhance cerebellar function.

== History ==
The first reports of NICS date back to the early 1960s, when German neurologist Oskar Vogt first used electrical stimulation to stimulate the cerebellum. Results of this study indicated the ability of electrical stimulation in the cerebellum to induce chances in muscle tone and movement. However, the use of an invasive procedure limited the clinical application and relevance of the study. The development of transcranial magnetic stimulation (TMS) in the 1980s opened new possibilities for the application NICS, and brain imaging techniques developed in the latter half of the 20th century later revealed the effects of cerebellum stimulation on higher cognitive functions such as language, emotion and attention. In the 1990s, researchers began to study the effects of TMS in humans. Since then, extensive studies have been conducted exploring the impact of NICS on cerebellar function and its possibilities in clinical contexts.

== Medical Use ==
As of 2024, the US Food and Drug Administration has authorized repetitive TMS devices for migraine, treatment-resistant major depressive disorder, obsessive-compulsive disorder, and quitting smoking. Other psychiatric indications such as schizophrenia and post-traumatic stress disorder remain under investigation.

Recent reviews show that research on non-invasive cerebellar stimulation has grown over the past few years, with growing evidence supporting applications in chronic pain, mood regulation, and social cognition. However these are based on small clinical samples, and most findings remain preliminary. TMS has also been investigated for its potential use in the treatment of chronic pain and stroke rehabilitation.

tDCS likewise have produced positive results in the treatment of disorders such as depression, anxiety, chronic pain and stroke rehabilitation. However, such evidence is still insufficient to be fully implemented in clinical practice and hence does not have FDA approval. Such research is to be further explored.

tACS are similar to this; having promising results in clinical trials but have insufficient research and understanding of mechanisms to further implement this in clinical practice.

=== Chronic pain ===
According to recent research, non-invasive cerebellar stimulation can lessen the severity of chronic pain conditions. By altering the cerebello-thalamo-cortical pathways involved in pain processing, the stimulation alleviates pain.

Cerebellar stimulation has also demonstrated to influence neural circuits related to pain, including areas involved in the sensory-emotional integration of pain, which may help explain some patients' therapeutic outcomes.

According to recent research, cerebellar stimulation may be used as a substitute treatment for chronic pain when traditional therapies are ineffective.

Researchers note that optimal stimulation parameters for chronic pain treatment are still unclear due to variation in intensity, duration, and electrode placement across studies.

=== Neurological disorders ===
==== Cerebellar ataxia ====
Cerebellar Ataxia are a complex group of degenerative disorders which impair voluntary movements and are associated with the cerebellum. The cerebellum plays a significant role in motor coordination, balance and posture, and its dysfunction is what results in Cerebellar Ataxia. Currently, there are no effective disease-modifying therapies for this condition. However, NICS has demonstrated potential as a therapeutic approach to address the clinical symptoms of patients with these debilitating disorders. The application of NICS techniques such as TMS and tDCS enable the alleviation of symptoms through improved motor function, although further research is needed before it can be broadly utilised within clinical context.

==== Dystonia ====
Dystonia is a multifaceted disorder that stems from cerebellar dysfunction, and it is marked by the development of uncontrollable muscle contractions. The capacity to restore functional cerebellar processing after impairments suggests NICS as a potential treatment to aid in the control of these symptoms within certain patients. The approach of TMS and tDCS provides a novel treatment target, however, the efficacy of using NICS within these parameters are undetermined.

=== Psychiatric disorders ===
==== Schizophrenia ====
Schizophrenia is a psychotic disorder resulting from the impairment of the cerebellum, and it is characterised by hallucinations, distorted thinking and delusions. The NICS technique of tDCS is commonly applied to Schizophrenia to alleviate symptoms and enhance cognitive, social, behavioural and emotional functions. However, clinical trials are needed in order to examine the possible therapeutic potential of tDCS in Schizophrenia.

== Benefits ==
NICS are a safer treatment option unlike invasive procedures and treatment options which require incisions and anaesthesia. These characteristics make it relatively safe and uncomplicated to administer. NICS enables patients to be treated without the hassle of being hospitalised or sedated as the procedure is often done in an outpatient setting. This is in particularly useful for patients who opt for untraditional treatments (avoiding surgery or use of drugs).

NICS are considered to be a cost-effective option for patients. The cost of these treatments may vary in the parameters for an individual patient, although cumulatively this is still a cost-effective option if the alternative is continuous drugs or referring to surgery.

Despite the limited information and research available for this topic, NICS withhold potential in the medical field to improve a variety of neuronal and psychiatric disorders.

== Limitations and adverse effects ==
Despite being reported as mostly safe, adverse effects still exist; which influence the patients' decision to pursue this form of treatment. The most common side effect reported are mild and transient which include headaches, scalp discomfort and tingling sensations. However, there are more severe side-effects reported including induced seizures, pain, syncope, transient induction of hypomania, hearing loss, transient impairment of working memory etc.

Such implications are due to the lack of research, particularly information regarding the effectiveness and the most optimal method of treatment. Techniques in inducing optimal parameters such as the intensity, target region of the magnetic field and current, duration of pulses, and type of treatment are still unspecified. Such methods (particularly RMS and tDCS) lack specific targeting to certain regions, which thus affects other regions of the brain which otherwise do not require intervention. Additionally, the methods included are not generalisable to all patients. There is more inter-individual variability in the response to cerebellar stimulation, thereafter it requires the calculation and determination of the specific target region for a patient. This information is still inconclusive and requires further research on how to optimally determine this.

The noted above issue of an undefined dose (time and field technical parameters) for appropriate and healthy stimulation can destroy healthy cells during the treatment procedure. In many current noninvasive electrical and magnetic therapies, stimulation involves excessive exposure of the patient to an intense field that exceeds natural currents and electromagnetic fields in the brain by times and even orders of magnitude.

Due to the lack of standardisation in the protocol of administering these interventions, NICS's are not currently suitable/advocated for application in clinical practice. In order for effective treatment to occur, specified protocols must be administered for each patient, which is impractical in a wide scale population. Due to the limited and mixed conclusions of studies, patients and medical practitioners alike may be hesitant to use and invest in these non-invasive methods. Instead more traditional, invasive methods are preferred; including oral medications or practical therapies.

== See also ==
- Deep brain stimulation
- Neuromodulation
- Neurostimulation
- Neurotechnology
- Neurotherapy
- Transcranial alternating current stimulation (tACS)
- Transcranial random noise stimulation (tRNS)
