= Neurostimulation =

Purposeful modulation of nervous system activity

- ICD-10-PCS: 00H00MZ
- OPS-301 code: 8-631

Neurostimulation is the purposeful modulation of the nervous system's activity using invasive (e.g., microelectrodes) or non-invasive means (e.g., transcranial magnetic stimulation, transcranial electric stimulation such as tDCS or tACS). Neurostimulation usually refers to the electromagnetic approaches to neuromodulation.

Neurostimulation technology can improve the life quality of those who are severely paralyzed or have profound losses to various sense organs, as well as for permanent reduction of severe, chronic pain which would otherwise require constant (around-the-clock), high-dose opioid therapy (such as neuropathic pain and spinal-cord injury). It serves as the key part of neural prosthetics for hearing aids, artificial vision, artificial limbs, and brain-machine interfaces. In the case of neural stimulation, primarily electrical stimulation is utilized, and charge-balanced biphasic constant current waveforms or capacitively coupled charge injection approaches are adopted. Alternatively, transcranial magnetic stimulation and transcranial electric stimulation have been proposed as non-invasive methods in which either a magnetic field or transcranially applied electric currents cause neurostimulation. A recent scientific review (2024) has identified relevant hypotheses on the cellular-level processes underlying non-invasive neurostimulation. Data analysis revealed that mitochondrial activity probably plays a central role in brain stimulation implemented by different approaches. In addition, analysis of the mother-fetus neurocognitive model provided insights into the conditions of natural neurostimulation of the fetal nervous system during pregnancy. Based on these results, the article suggested the hypothesis of the origin of neurostimulation during gestation. According to this position, natural neurostimulation occurs during pregnancy due to the electromagnetic properties of the mother's heart and its interaction with the mother's own and fetal nervous system. Natural neurostimulation ensures the balanced development of the embryo's nervous system and guarantees the development of the correct architecture of the nervous system with the necessary cognitive functions corresponding to the ecological context and the qualities that make human beings unique. According to Latvian prof Igor Val Danilov, natural neurostimulation is the basis of many neurostimulation techniques.

== Brain stimulation ==
Brain stimulation has the potential to treat some disorders such as epilepsy. In this method, scheduled stimulation is applied to specific cortical or subcortical targets. There are available commercial devices that can deliver an electrical pulse at scheduled time intervals. Scheduled stimulation is hypothesized to alter the intrinsic neurophysiologic properties of epileptic networks. According to prof Barbara Jobst and colleagues, the most explored targets for scheduled stimulation are the anterior nucleus of the thalamus and the hippocampus. The anterior nucleus of the thalamus has been studied, which has shown a significant seizure reduction with the stimulator on versus off during several months after stimulator implantation. Moreover, the cluster headache (CH) can be treated by using a temporary stimulating electrode at sphenopalatine ganglion (SPG). Medical Dr. Mehdi Ansarinia and colleagues reported pain relief within several minutes of stimulation in this method. To avoid use of implanted electrodes, researchers have engineered ways to inscribe a "window" made of zirconia that has been modified to be transparent and implanted in mice skulls, to allow optical waves to penetrate more deeply, as in optogenetics, to stimulate or inhibit individual neurons.

== Deep brain stimulation ==
Deep brain stimulation (DBS) has shown benefits for movement disorders such as Parkinson's disease, tremor and dystonia and other neuropsychiatric disorders such as depression, obsessive-compulsive disorder, Tourette syndrome, chronic pain and cluster headache. DBS can directly change the brain activity in a controlled manner and is hence used to map fundamental mechanisms of brain functions along with neuroimaging methods.

A DBS system consists of three components: the implanted pulse generator (IPG), the lead, and an extension. The implantable pulse generator (PG) generates stimulation pulses, which are sent to intracranial leads at the target via an extension. The stimulation pulses interfere with neural activity at the target site.

The application and effects of DBS, on both normal and diseased brains, involves many parameters. These include the physiological properties of the brain tissue, which may change with disease state. Also important are the stimulation parameters, such as amplitude and temporal characteristics, and the geometric configuration of the electrode and the tissue that surrounds it.

In spite of a huge number of studies on DBS, its mechanism of action is still not well understood. Developing DBS microelectrodes is still challenging.

== Non-invasive brain stimulation ==
There are five main domains of non-invasive neurostimulation:

- Photonic neurostimulation through the image-forming vision pathways and skin irradiation. This technique is also known as Light therapy, or Phototherapy, or Luxtherapy. It refers to the body's exposure to intensive artificial light at controlled wavelengths to treat different diseases.
- Transcranial laser radiation refers to directional low-power and high-fluence monochromatic or quasi monochromatic light radiation, also known as photobiomodulation (PBM).
- Transcranial electric current and magnetic field stimulations (see further sections Transcranial magnetic stimulation and Transcranial electrical stimulation).
- Low-frequency sound stimulations, including vibroacoustic therapy (VAT) and rhythmic auditory stimulation (RAS).
- Acoustic photonic intellectual neurostimulation (APIN). This technique applies features of natural neurostimulation.

=== Acoustic photonic intellectual neurostimulation ===
This non-invasive brain stimulation approach simulates the features of natural neurostimulation of the fetal nervous system during pregnancy, scaled to the treatment parameters of the specific patient. The therapeutic effect of the APIN technique relies on the fact that energy stimuli enhance mitochondrial activity and that a pulsed electromagnetic field provides microvascular vasodilation. Three therapeutic agents cause oxygenation of neuronal tissues, release of adenosine-5′-triphosphate proteins, and neuronal plasticity. This method shows significant results in chronic pain management in various conditions.

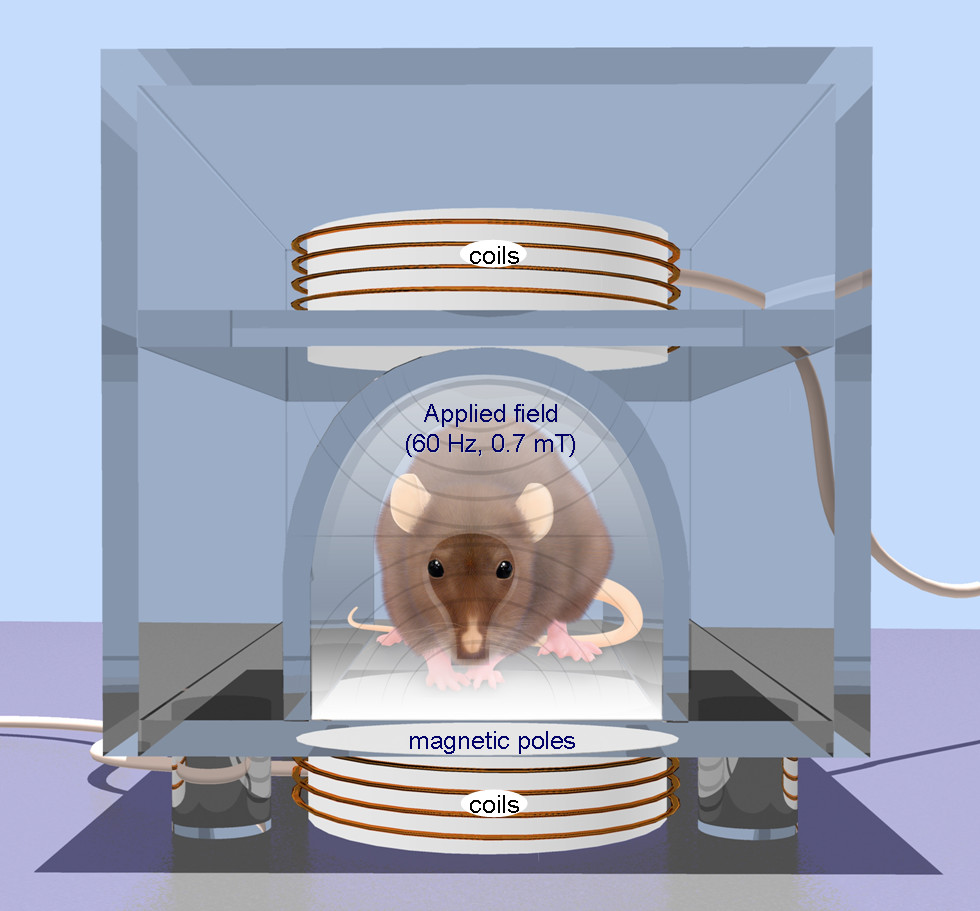
rTMS in a rodent. From Oscar Arias-Carrión, 2008

=== Transcranial magnetic stimulation ===
Compared to electrical stimulation that utilizes brief, high-voltage electric shock to activate neurons, which can potentially activate pain fibers, transcranial magnetic stimulation (TMS) was developed by Baker in 1985. TMS uses a magnetic wire above the scalp, which carries a sharp and high current pulse. A time variant magnetic field is induced perpendicular to the coil due to the applied pulse which consequently generates an electric field based on Maxwell's law. The electric field provides the necessary current for a non-invasive and much less painful stimulation. There are two TMS devices called single pulse TMS and repetitive pulse TMS (rTMS) while the latter has greater effect but potential to cause seizure. TMS can be used for therapy particularly in psychiatry, as a tool to measure central motor conduction and a research tool to study different aspects of human brain physiology such as motor function, vision, and language. The rTMS method has been used to treat epilepsy with rates of 8–25 Hz for 10 seconds. The other therapeutic uses of rTMS include parkinson diseases, dystonia and mood diseases. Also, TMS can be used to determine the contribution of cortical networks to specific cognitive functions by disrupting activity in the focal brain region. Early, inconclusive, results have been obtained in recovery from coma (persistent vegetative state) by Pape et al. (2009).

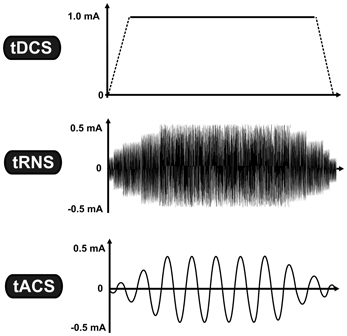
Transcranial electrical stimulation of techniques. While tDCS uses constant current intensity, tRNS and tACS use oscillating current. The vertical axis represents the current intensity in milliamp (mA), while the horizontal axis illustrates the time-course.

=== Transcranial electrical stimulation ===
Transcranial electrical stimulation (tES) is a form of non-invasive brain stimulation that influences neuronal states via different waveforms that are applied from outside the cranium. This technique induces changes in the electrical activity inside and outside neurons; these electrical changes can alter the resting potential of the membrane.

In comparison to TMS devices, tES devices are smaller and more affordable. TES devices also have weaker electrical signals which is enough to modulate neurons without leading to action potentials; however, this weakness can create issues when trying to target an area of the brain more precisely or targeting a subcortical region.

==== Main tES modulation methods ====
- Transcranial direct current stimulation (tDCS)
- Transcranial alternating current stimulation (tACS)
- Transcranial pulsed current stimulation (tPCS)
- Transcranial random noise stimulation (tRNS)

== Spinal cord stimulation ==
Spinal cord stimulation (SCS) is an effective therapy for the treatment of chronic and intractable pain including diabetic neuropathy, failed back surgery syndrome, complex regional pain syndrome, phantom limb pain, ischemic limb pain, refractory unilateral limb pain syndrome, postherpetic neuralgia and acute herpes zoster pain. Another pain condition that is a potential candidate for SCS treatment is Charcot-Marie-Tooth (CMT) disease, which is associated with moderate to severe chronic extremity pain. SCS therapy consists of the electrical stimulation of the spinal cord to 'mask' pain. The gate theory proposed in 1965 by Prof Ronald Melzack and Prof Wall provided a theoretical construct to attempt SCS as a clinical treatment for chronic pain. This theory postulates that activation of large diameter, myelinated primary afferent fibers suppresses the response of dorsal horn neurons to input from small, unmyelinated primary afferents. A simple SCS system consists of three different parts. First, microelectrodes are implanted in the epidural space to deliver stimulation pulses to the tissue. Second, an electrical pulse generator implanted in the lower abdominal area or gluteal region is connected to the electrodes via wires, and third a remote control to adjust the stimulus parameters such as pulse width and pulse rate in the PG. Improvements have been made in both the clinical aspects of SCS such as transition from subdural placement of contacts to epidural placement, which reduces the risk and morbidity of SCS implantation, and also technical aspects of SCS such as improving percutaneous leads, and fully implantable multi-channel stimulators. However, there are many parameters that need to be optimized including number of implanted contacts, contact size and spacing, and electrical sources for stimulation. The stimulus pulse width and pulse rate are important parameters that need to be adjusted in SCS, which are typically 400 us and 8–200 Hz respectively.

=== Spinal cord stimulation for movement disorders ===
Spinal cord stimulation has shown promising results in spinal cord injury and other movement disorders, such as multiple sclerosis. The stimulation, applied over the lumbar spinal cord, works by activating large diameter afferent fibers entering the spinal cord, which then transsynaptically activate and engage spinal neuronal networks. The same target structures can also be activated by transcutaneous electrodes placed over the lower thoracic spine and abdomen. Transcutaneous spinal cord stimulation is completely non-invasive and, as it uses TENS electrodes and stimulators, can be applied at low cost. Yet, in comparison to the implanted epidural variant, the efficacy of transcutaneous spinal cord stimulation depends more strongly on the body position and spinal alignment, which could lead to inconsistent result if the body position and posture isn't controlled during the application.

== Transcutaneous supraorbital nerve stimulation ==
Tentative evidence supports transcutaneous supraorbital nerve stimulation. Side effects are few.

== Cochlear implants ==
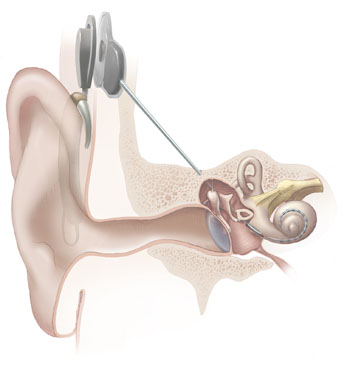
Cochlear implant

Cochlear implants have provided partial hearing to more than 120,000 persons worldwide as of 2008. The electrical stimulation is used in a cochlear implant to provide functional hearing in totally deafened persons. Cochlear implants include several subsystem components from the external speech processor and radio frequency (RF) transmission link to the internal receiver, stimulator, and electrode arrays. Modern cochlear implant research started in the 1960s and 1970s. In 1961, a crude single electrode device was implanted in two deaf patients and useful hearing with electric stimulation was reported. The first FDA approved complete single channel device was released in 1984. In cochlear implants, the sound is picked up by a microphone and transmitted to the behind-the-ear external processor to be converted to the digital data. The digitized data is then modulated on a radio frequency signal and transmitted to an antenna inside a headpiece. The data and power carrier are transmitted through a pair of coupled coils to the hermetically sealed internal unit. By extracting the power and demodulating the data, electric current commands are sent to the cochlea to stimulate the auditory nerve through microelectrodes. The key point is that the internal unit does not have a battery and it should be able to extract the required energy. To reduce the risk of infection, data is transmitted wirelessly along with power. Inductively coupled coils are good candidates for power and data telemetry, although radio-frequency transmission could provide better efficiency and data rates. Parameters needed by the internal unit include the pulse amplitude, pulse duration, pulse gap, active electrode, and return electrode that are used to define a biphasic pulse and the stimulation mode. An example of the commercial devices include Nucleus 22 device that utilized a carrier frequency of 2.5 MHz and later in the newer revision called Nucleus 24 device, the carrier frequency was increased to 5 MHz. The internal unit in the cochlear implants is an ASIC (application-specific integrated circuit) chip that is responsible to ensure safe and reliable electric stimulation. Inside the ASIC chip, there is a forward pathway, a backward pathway, and control units. The forward pathway recovers digital information from the RF signal which includes stimulation parameters and some handshaking bits to reduce the communication error. The backward pathway usually includes a back telemetry voltage sampler that reads the voltage over a period of time on the recording electrode. The stimulator block is responsible to deliver predetermined current by external unit to the microelectrodes. This block includes a reference current and a digital-to-analog converter to transform digital commands to an analog current.

== Visual prosthesis ==
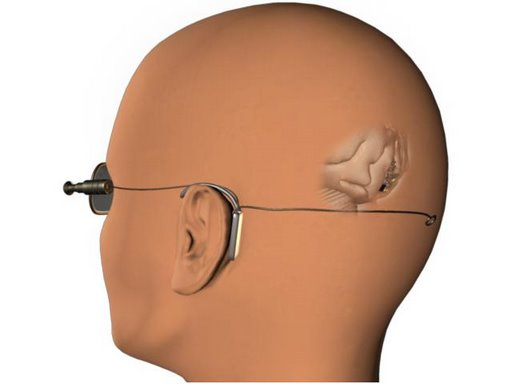
The Visual Cortical Implant

Theoretical and experimental clinical evidences suggest that direct electrical stimulation of the retina might be able to provide some vision to subjects who have lost the photoreceptive elements of their retina. Therefore, visual prostheses are developed to restore vision for the blind by using the stimulation. Depending upon which visual pathway location is targeted for neural stimulation, different approaches have been considered. Visual pathway consists mainly of the eye, optic nerve, lateral geniculate nucleus (LGN), and visual cortex. Therefore, retinal, optic nerve and visual cortex stimulation are the three different methods used in visual prostheses. Retinal degenerative diseases, such as retinitis pigmentosa (RP) and age-related macular degeneration (AMD), are two likely candidate diseases in which retinal stimulation may be helpful. Three approaches called intraocular epiretinal, subretinal and extraocular transretinal stimulation are pursued in retinal devices that stimulate remaining retinal neural cells to bypass lost photoreceptors and allow the visual signal to reach the brain via the normal visual pathway. In epiretinal approach, electrodes are placed on the top side of the retina near ganglion cells, whereas the electrodes are placed under the retina in subretinal approaches. Finally, the posterior scleral surface of the eye is the place in which extraocular approach electrodes are positioned. Second Sight and the Humayun group at USC are the most active groups in the design of intraocular retinal prostheses. The ArgusTM 16 retinal implant is an intraocular retinal prosthesis utilizing video processing technologies. Regarding to the visual cortex stimulation, Brindley, and Dobelle were the first ones who did the experiments and demonstrated that by stimulating the top side of the visual cortex most of the electrodes can produce visual percept. More recently Professor Sawan built a complete implant for intracortical stimulation and validated the operation in rats.

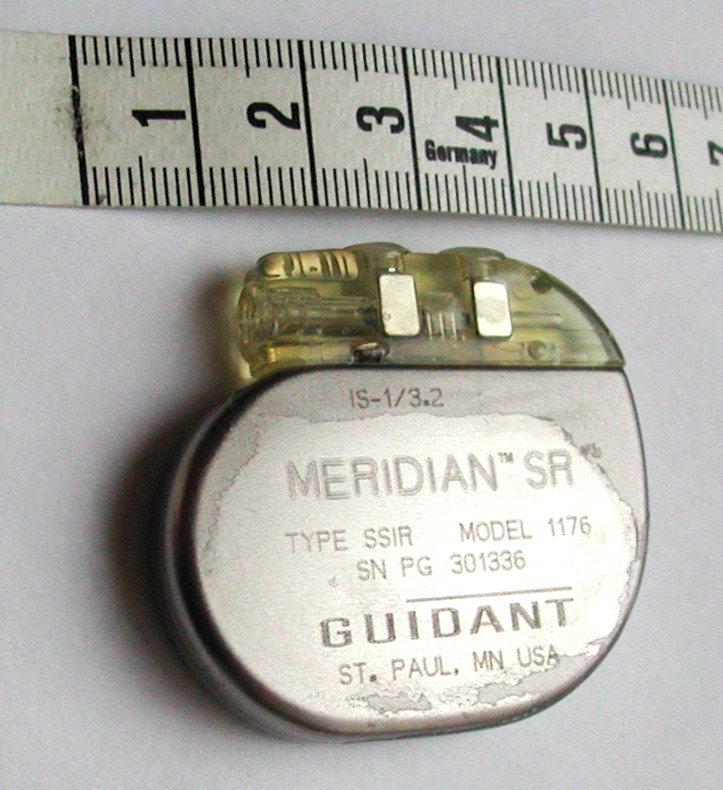
A pacemaker, scale in centimeters

LGN, which is located in the midbrain to relay signals from the retina to the visual cortex, is another potential area that can be used for stimulation. But this area has limited access due to surgical difficulty. The recent success of deep brain stimulation techniques targeting the midbrain has encouraged research to pursue the approach of LGN stimulation for a visual prosthesis.

== Cardiac electrostimulation devices ==
Implantable pacemakers were proposed for the first time in 1959 and became more sophisticated since then. The therapeutic application of pacemakers consists of numerous rhythm disturbances including some forms of tachycardia (too fast a heart beat), heart failure, and even stroke. Early implantable pacemakers worked only a short time and needed periodic recharging by an inductive link. These implantable pacemakers needed a pulse generator to stimulate heart muscles with a certain rate in addition to electrodes. Today, modern pulse generators are programmed non-invasively by sophisticated computerized machines using RF, obtaining information about the patient's and device's status by telemetry. Also they use a single hermetically sealed lithium iodide (LiI) cell as the battery. The pacemaker circuitry includes sense amplifiers to detect the heart's intrinsic electrical signals, which are used to track heart activity, rate adaptive circuitry, which determine the need for increased or reduced pacing rate, a microprocessor, memory to store the parameters, telemetry control for communication protocol and power supplies to provide regulated voltage.

== Stimulation microelectrode technologies ==
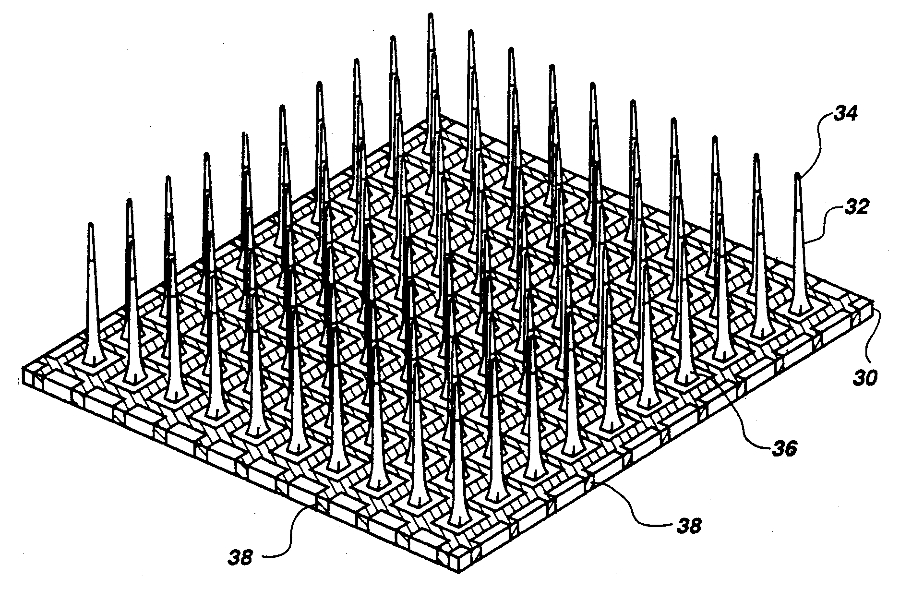
Utah microelectrode array

Microelectrodes are one of the key components of the neurostimulation, which deliver the current to neurons. Typical microelectrodes have three main components: a substrate (the carrier), a conductive metal layer, and an insulation material. In cochlear implants, microelectrodes are formed from platinum-iridium alloy. State-of-the-art electrodes include deeper insertion to better match the tonotopic place of stimulation to the frequency band assigned to each electrode channel, improving efficiency of stimulation, and reducing insertion related trauma. These cochlear implant electrodes are either straight or spiral such as Med-El Combi 40+ and Advanced Bionics Helix microelectrodes respectively. In visual implants, there are two types of electrode arrays called planar type or three dimensional needle or pillar type, where needle type array such as Utah array is mostly used for cortical and optic nerve stimulations and rarely used in retinal implants due to the possible damage of retina. However, a pillar-shaped gold electrode array on thin-film polyimide has been used in an extraocular implant. On the other hand, planar stretchable microelectrode arrays are formed from flexible polymers, such as silicone, polyimide, and Parylene as candidates for retinal implants. Regarding to DBS microelectrodes an array, which can be controlled independently, distributed throughout the target nucleus would permit precise control of the spatial distribution of the stimulation, and thus, allow better personalized DBS. There are several requirements for DBS microelectrodes that include long lifetime without injury to the tissue or degradation of the electrodes, customized for different brain sites, long-term biocompatibility of the material, mechanically durable in order to reach the target without being damaged during handling by the implant surgeon, and finally uniformity of performance across the microelectrodes in a particular array. Tungsten microwire, iridium microwires, and sputtered or electrodeposited Platinum-iridium alloy microelectrodes are the examples of microelectrode used in DBS. Silicon carbide is a potential interesting material for realizing biocompatible semiconductor devices.

== Limitations ==
Brain tissue stimulation using non-invasive electrical and magnetic field methods raises several concerns, including the following:

The first issue is the uncertain dose (time and technical field parameters) for correct and healthy stimulation. While neurophysiology lacks knowledge about the nature of such a treatment of nervous diseases at the cellular level, many non-invasive electrical and magnetic therapeutic methods involve excessive exposure of the patient to an intense field, which is several times and even orders of magnitude higher than natural currents and electromagnetic fields in the brain.

Another significant challenge of non-invasive electrical and magnetic field methods is the impossibility of localizing the effect of stimulation on tissues in the relevant neural networks. We still need to gain knowledge about mental processes at the cellular level. The relationship between neural activity and cognitive processes continues to be a question among researchers and challenge for treatment selection; therefore, it is uncertain if electrical and magnetic fields reach only those neural structures of the brain that require treatment. An undefined dose and target of radiation can destroy healthy cells during a procedure. Non-invasive brain tissue stimulation targets a large area of poorly characterized tissue. The inability to localize the effect of stimulation makes it challenging to target stimulation only to the desired neural networks.

Additionally, these methods are not generalizable to all patients because of more inter-individual variability in response to brain stimulation.

== History ==
The primary findings about neurostimulation originated from the idea to stimulate nerves for therapeutic purposes. The 1st recorded use of electrical stimulation for pain relief goes back to 46 AD, when Scribonius Largus used torpedo fish (electric ray) for relieving headaches. In the late 18th century, Luigi Galvani discovered that the muscles of dead frog legs twitched when struck by direct current on the nervous system. The modulation of the brain activity by electrical stimulation of the motor cortex in dogs was shown in 1870 that resulted in limb movement. From the late 18th century to today many milestones have been developed. Nowadays, sensory prosthetic devices, such as visual implants, cochlear implants, auditory midbrain implants, and spinal cord stimulators and also motor prosthetic devices, such as deep brain stimulators, Bion microstimulators, the brain control and sensing interface, and cardiac electro-stimulation devices are widely used.

In 2013 the British pharmaceutical company GlaxoSmithKline (GSK) coined the term "electroceutical" to broadly encompass medical devices that use electrical, mechanical, or light stimulation to affect electrical signaling in relevant tissue types. Clinical neural implants such as cochlear implants to restore hearing, retinal implants to restore sight, spinal cord stimulators for pain relief or cardiac pacemakers and implantable defibrillators are proposed examples of electroceuticals. GSK formed a venture fund and said it would host a conference in 2013 to lay out a research agenda for the field. A 2016 review of research on interactions between the nervous and immune systems in autoimmune disorders mentioned "electroceuticals" in passing and quotation marks, referring to neurostimulation devices in development for conditions like arthritis.

In 2024, the introduction of the Mother-Fetus neurocognitive model and definition of the natural neurostimulation features revealed new perspectives to develop a novel generation of electroceutical medical devices.

In 2025, two state-first human-stage clinical trials began in Western Australia, aiming to use neurostimulation therapy via surface electrodes for participants with paraplegia and quadriplegia.

== Research ==
In addition to the enormous usage of neurostimulation for clinical applications, it is also used widely in laboratories started dates back to 1920s by people like Delgado who used stimulation as an experimental manipulation to study basics of how the brain works. The primary works were on the reward center of the brain in which stimulation of those structures led to pleasure that requested more stimulation. Another most recent example is the electrical stimulation of the middle temporal (MT) area of primary visual cortex to bias perception. In particular, the directionality of motion is represented in a regular way in the MT area. They presented monkeys with moving images on screen and monkey throughput was to determine what the direction is. They found that by systematically introducing some errors to the monkey's responses, by stimulating the MT area which is responsible for perceiving the motion in another direction, the monkey responded to somewhere in between the actual motion and the stimulated one. This was an elegant use of stimulation to show that MT area is essential in the actual perception of motion. Within the memory field, stimulation is used very frequently to test the strength of the connection between one bundle of cells to another by applying a small current in one cell which results in the release of neurotransmitters and measuring the postsynaptic potential.

Generally, a short but high-frequency current in the range of 100 Hz helps strengthening the connection known as long-term potentiation. However, longer but low-frequency current tends to weaken the connections known as long-term depression.

== See also ==
- Experience machine
- Neuromodulation
- Neurotechnology
- Neurotherapy
- Non-invasive cerebellar stimulation
- Wirehead (science fiction)
