= NICS =

NICS is a four-letter abbreviation with multiple meanings, such as:

- Network of International Christian Schools, a small association operating schools in various countries
- National Instant Criminal Background Check System in the United States
- Non-invasive cerebellar stimulation
- Northern Ireland Civil Service
  - Northern Ireland Civil Service F.C., a football club
- Nucleus-independent chemical shift
- National Insurance Contributions (NICs) in the United Kingdom
- National Institute for Computational Sciences, a supercomputing center managed by the University of Tennessee

== See also ==
- NIC (disambiguation)
