= Music as a coping strategy =

Use of music to reduce stress

Music as a coping strategy involves the use of music (through listening or playing music) in order to reduce stress, as well as many of the psychological and physical manifestations associated with it. The use of music to cope with stress is an example of an emotion-focused, adaptive coping strategy. Rather than focusing on the stressor itself, music therapy is typically geared towards reducing or eliminating the emotions that arise in response to stress. In essence, advocates of this therapy claim that the use of music helps to lower stress levels in patients, as well as lower more biologically measurable quantities such as the levels of epinephrine and cortisol. Additionally, music therapy programs have been repeatedly demonstrated to reduce depression and anxiety symptoms in the long term. Music is widely recognized in healthcare literature as a non-pharmacological coping mechanism that can reduce stress and improve emotional regulation.

== Major theories ==
In the context of psychology, a coping strategy is any technique or practice designed to reduce or manage the negative effects associated with stress. While stress is known to be a natural biological response, biologists and psychologists have repeatedly demonstrated that stress in excess can lead to negative effects on one's physical and psychological well-being. Elevated stress levels can lead to conditions including mental illnesses, cardiovascular conditions, eating disorders, gastrointestinal complications, sexual dysfunction, and skin and hair problems. The variety and potential fatality from these conditions push the need for a coping mechanism to reduce the manifestations associated with stress.

While there are hundreds of different coping strategies, the use of music is one specific example of a coping strategy that is used to combat the negative effects of stress. Due to the substantially large number of strategies to choose from, psychologists break down coping strategies into three types:

1. Appraisal-based - Intended to modify the individual's thought process. Stress is typically eliminated through rationalization, changes in values or thinking patterns, or with humor.
2. Problem-based - Targets the cause of the stress. The process could either involve eliminating or adapting to a stressor in order to cope. An example of a problem based strategy is time management.
3. Emotion-based - Geared towards influencing one's emotional reactions when stressed. Meditation, distractions, or the release of emotion are all forms of emotion-based coping strategies. Mindfulness-based stress reduction is another example of this, as it is a more personal reflection based aspect of coping.

Since music-based coping is designed to modify an individual's emotional reactions to a certain event, it is best classified as an emotion-based coping strategy. Rather than attempting to directly influence or eliminate a particular stressor, music-based coping relies on influencing an individual's emotional and mental reaction to the stressor. Music assuages stress by either reducing or altering emotional response or alleviate some of the physiological effects of the stress response.

== Major empirical findings ==
Psychologists and medical practitioners have recently focused more time and attention on the concept of music as a coping strategy and the effects of its use on patients. In literature linking music and stress, empirical findings are typically grouped together according to the method in which they are gathered. For example, some methods may include studies like survey questions or more invasive methods of study like invasive psychoacoustic observations. Despite the fact that different methods are used, most of these studies demonstrate the impact different types of music have on human emotions.

=== Patient response-based findings ===
One of the more popular methods used to collect data on coping strategies involves the use of non-invasive, patient response-based methods. This method is directed more towards the psychological realm, in that the methods used to collect data were not very invasive but more of a "tell me how you feel" type of question/response system. Once the findings had been gathered, statistical analysis was performed in an effort to discover a correlation between the coping mechanism and its effect on the stress response. These non-invasive treatments are more popular among children and elderly patients, since they prevent the results from being altered due to the patients's nervousness. Proponents of these methods claim that if children are prompted with general, unthreatening questions, they are much more comfortable and willing to provide accurate accounts of their levels of stress. In several studies using non-invasive methods, music has been documented as being effective in reducing the subject's perceived level of stress.

==== Music and effects on psychological trauma ====
Posttraumatic stress disorder (PTSD) is a psychological stress disorder that involves the experience of strong emotional reactions due to traumatic events in an individual's past. PTSD is almost always a result of a traumatic experience. Certain triggers, such as images, sounds, or other significant sensory details associated with the experience can evoke extreme stress responses, panic attacks, or severe anxiety. PTSD is commonly experienced by veterans of armed conflicts, and can be frequently diagnosed in victims of rape or other violent assaults.

If an individual diagnosed with PTSD associates a certain song with a traumatic memory, it typically triggers a stronger stress/anxiety response than the individual would otherwise have otherwise experienced when listening to the song. While one cannot assume that music is the only factor that triggers PTSD-influenced stress and panic attacks, these can be especially memorable because of music's rhythm, beat, and/or memorable lyrics. However, associating music with psychological responses is not necessarily guaranteed to bring up bad memories, because music can often hold psychological connotations to very happy memories. For example, it has been demonstrated that supplying the residents of nursing homes with iPods that feature nostalgic music is a means of reducing the stress of the elderly.

Music has been used to treat dementia patients by utilizing methods similar to the treatments that are used in the management of PTSD. However, in the treatment of dementia, more emphasis is placed on providing the patient with music that triggers pleasant memories or feelings, rather than avoiding music that triggers negative emotions. After the music is listened to, one sees the change in mood and attitude from closed and distant to joyful, open and happy.

There is a wealth of anecdotal evidence demonstrating the effectiveness that music can have as a coping response in this regard. For example, if a patient of either PTSD or dementia were to have a loved one die, he or she might associate a certain song with the person being mourned for, and hearing that song could bring about feelings of happiness or deep sadness. In addition, if there was a certain connection between them, such as in marriage, and their wedding song came on, an overly powerful emotional reaction could occur. These overly emotional situations trigger memories and a stress response that anguishes the person remembering these hurtful memories. A certain song that pertains to that memory can trigger nearly any emotion.

Music's effects on dementia patients have shown to bring them out of their shell, and engage them in singing and being happy, opposed to their usual closed and distant personalities. The patients have been shown to sing and perk up, even cry out of pure joy of the music that they loved in their youth. After the patients listen to their music they were interviewed and actually engaged, because of how happy the music had made them. The patients talked about how much they loved the music and the memories that the music invoked.

==== Stress and music in the medical field ====
The use of music as a coping strategy also has applications in the medical field. For example, patients who listen to music during surgery or post-operative recovery have been shown to have less stress than their counterparts who do not listen to music. Studies have shown that the family members and parents of the patient had reduced stress levels when listening to music while waiting, and can even reduce their anxiety for the surgery results. The use of music has also been proven effective in pediatric oncology. Music therapy is mainly used in these cases as a diversion technique, play therapy, designed to distract the patient from the pain or stress experienced during these operations. The focus of the patient is directed at a more pleasurable activity and the mind shifts toward that activity creating a "numbing" effect founded on an "out of sight, out of mind" type approach. This can even transcend to elderly patients in nursing homes and adult day care centers. Music therapy in these places have shown reductions in elder aggression and agitated moods. However, because several of these studies rely mainly on patient responses, some concerns have been raised as to the strength of the correlation between music and stress reduction.

Music as a form of coping has been used multiple times in cancer patients, with promising results. A study done on 113 patients going through stem cell transplants split the patients into two group; one group made their own lyrics about their journey and then produced a music video, and the other group listened to audiobooks. The results of the study showed that the music video group had better coping skills and better social interactions in comparison, by taking their mind of the pain and stress accompanying treatment, and giving them an outlet to express their feelings.

Another study done at UNC showed remarkable improvement in a young girl who was born without the ability to speak. A therapist would come in and sing with her, as the only thing she could do was sing. Miraculously, the singing allowed to her gain the ability of speech, as music and speech are similar in nature and help the brain form new connections. In the same hospital, the therapist visits children daily and plays music with them, singing and using instruments. The music fosters creativity and reduces stress associated with treatments, and takes the children's minds off of their current surroundings.

It also cannot be ignored the importance of coping strategies in families and caregivers of those going through serious and even terminal illness. These family members are often responsible for a vast majority of the care of their loved ones, on top of the stress of seeing them struggle. Therapists have worked with these family members, singing and playing instruments, to help them take their minds off of the stress of helping their loved ones undergo treatment. Just like in the patients themselves, the music therapy has been shown to help them cope with the intense emotions and situations they deal with on a daily basis.

=== Physiological findings ===
Other studies, which use more invasive techniques to measure the response of individuals to stress, demonstrate that the use of music can mitigate many of the physiological effects often associated with the stress response - such as a lowering of blood pressure or a decrease in heart rate. Most research associated with the use of music as a coping strategy makes use of empirical measurements through devices like an EKG or heart rate monitor in order to provide a stronger correlation between music and its proposed effects on the stress response. In these studies, subjects are typically exposed to a stressor and then assigned music to listen to, while the parties conducting the study measure changes in the subjects' physiological status.

Some studies, using more invasive physiological research methods, have demonstrated that the use of sedative music or preferred sedative music cause a decrease in tension and state-anxiety levels of adult individuals. This decrease in tension or feeling of anxiety is more prevalent and noticeable in the attempt to return to homeostasis, and shows far less effectiveness during the actual stressful event. Other studies expose their subjects to an immediate physical stressor, such as running on a treadmill, while having them listen to different genres of music. These studies have shown that the respiratory rates of the participants are increased when they listen to faster, upbeat music while running in comparison to no music or sedative music. In addition to the raised respiratory frequency caused by the initial stressor "running" music still had a noticeable physiological effect on the participants.

By and large, a collective review of these studies shows that music can be effective in reducing physiological effects that stress has on the human body. This can be anywhere from changing pulse rates, breathing rates, to even decreasing the occurrence of fatigue. This can even be seen in different tempo's and pitch, such as low pitch creates a relatively calming effect on the body whereas high pitch tends to generate stressors for the body. Furthermore, it has been suggested that if a patient can control the music that he or she listens to in the recovery process, then the return to normalcy happens at a much faster, more efficient rate than if the subject was assigned a music genre that he or she did not find appealing. With the use of the EKG monitor and other empirical methods of study, researchers are able to remove the superficial qualities associated with patient response-based findings and provide a more substantial correlation between the use of music and its effects on the human stress response.

== Specific techniques ==
One particular technique that uses music as a coping strategy is choosing and listening to music genres that have been shown to correlate with lower levels of stress. For example, it has been suggested that listening to classical music or self-selected music can lower stress levels in adult individuals. Music that is fast, heavy or even dark in nature may produce an increase in these same stress levels, however many people also find the cathartic effects of music to be intensified with the listening of music that is intense in such a way. Ambient music is a genre of music that is often associated with feelings of calmness or introspectiveness. While listening to self-selected genres, an individual is provided with a sense of control after choosing the type of music he or she would like to listen to. In certain situations, this choice can be one of the few moments where stressed and depressed individuals feel a locus of control over their respective lives. Introducing the feeling of control can be a valuable asset as the individual attempts to cope with his or her stress.

With that in mind, there are a few specific techniques specifically involving the use of music that have been suggested to aid in the reduction of stress and stress-related effects.

- Listening to softer genres such as classical music.
- Listening to music of one's choice and introducing an element of control to one's life.
- Listening to music that reminds one of pleasant memories.
- Avoiding music that reminds one of sad or depressing memories.
- Listening to music as a way of bonding with a social group.

Another specific technique that can be used is the utilization of music as a "memory time machine" of sorts. In this regard, music can allow one to escape to pleasant or unpleasant memories and trigger a coping response. It has been suggested that music can be closely tied to re-experiencing the psychological aspects of memories, so selecting music with positive connotations is one possible way that music can reduce stress.

A technique that is starting to be employed more often is vibroacoustic therapy. During therapy the patient lies on his/her back on a mat with speakers within it that send out low frequency sound waves, essentially sitting on a subwoofer. This therapy has been found to help with Parkinson's disease, fibromyalgia, and depression. Studies are also being conducted on patients with mild Alzheimer's disease in hopes to identify possible benefits from vibroacoustic therapy. Vibroacoustic therapy can also be used as an alternative to music therapy for the deaf.

== Controversies ==
Several of the empirical studies carried out to demonstrate the correlation between listening to music and the reduction in the human stress response have been criticized for relying too heavily on a small sample size. Another criticism of these studies is that they have been carried out in response to no stressor in particular. These critics claim that because no specific stressor is identified in many of these studies, it is somewhat difficult to identify whether the stress response was lessened by music or by some other means.

A more theoretical critique of this coping strategy is that the use of music in stress coping is largely a short-term coping response and therefore lacks long-term sustainability. These critics argue that while music may be effective in lowering perceived stress levels of patients, it is not necessarily making a difference on the actual cause of the stress response. Because the root cause of the stress is not affected, it is possible that the stress response may return shortly after therapy is ended. Those who hold this position advocate instead for a more problem-focused coping strategy that directly deals with the stressors affecting the patient.

== Conclusion ==
The use of music as a stress coping strategy has a demonstrated effect on the human response to stress. The use of music has been proven to lower the perceived levels of stress in patients, while greatly reducing the physical manifestations of stress as well– such as heart rate, blood pressure, or levels of stress hormones. It seems as though different types of music have different effects on stress levels, with classical and self-selected genres being the most effective. However, despite demonstrated effectiveness in empirical studies, there are many who still question the effectiveness of this coping strategy. Nevertheless, it is still an attractive option for some patients who want an easy and inexpensive way to respond to stress.

== See also ==
- Music therapy
- Coping (psychology)
- Mindfulness-based stress reduction
- Coping strategies
- Stress management
