= Exciter =

Exciter may refer to:

== Music ==
- Exciter (band), a Canadian speed metal band
  - Exciter (Exciter album), also known as O.T.T., a 1988 album by Exciter
- Exciter (Depeche Mode album), a 2001 album by Depeche Mode
- "Exciter" (song) a 1978 song by Judas Priest from Stained Class
- "Excite", a 1999 song by Bomb Factory from Bomb Factory
- "Exciter", a 1983 song by Kiss from Lick It Up

== Other uses ==
- Exciter (effect), audio effect unit
- Exciter (audio transducer), a transducer.
- Exciter bulb, a light source for reading the optical soundtrack on motion picture film
- Exciter, the oscillator and modulator together in large transmitters
- Exciter, a component in an electrical alternator that provides direct current for excitation of a permanent magnet
- S2 6.8 Exciter, an American sailboat design
- Yamaha Exciter, a motorcycle model manufactured by Yamaha Motor Corporation

== See also ==
- Excitation (disambiguation)
- Excited (disambiguation)
