= Transcranial direct stimulation in Parkinson's disease gait rehabilitation =

Gait variability seen in Parkinson's Disorders arise due to cortical changes induced by pathophysiology of the disease process. Gait rehabilitation is focused to harness the adapted connections involved actively to control these variations during the disease progression. Gait variabilities seen are attributed to the defective inputs from the Basal Ganglia. However, there is altered activation of other cortical areas that support the deficient control to bring about a movement and maintain some functional mobility.

Transcranial direct-current stimulation is a modification of the traditionally available direct current applied with 2 saline soaked electrodes (active and reference: 5-35 cm2) with active placed at the area to be stimulated and reference electrode placed at the contralateral supraorbital region in the forehead. Focality of the current passes depends upon the position of the electrode, its dimensions and the current density. The duration of the stimulation varies from 5-20 mins with intensities of 0.5-2.0 mA. It has been successfully introduced as a promising therapeutic adjuvant in various rehabilitation procedures. It alters cortical excitability of region of interest that can be harnessed to optimized motor priming and motor learning procedures involved in gait rehabilitation Mechanisms resulting in post synaptic changes to induce long lasting plasticity is like that of LTP (long-term potentiation) and LTD (long-term Depression) depending upon polarity of the current used.

== Gait variabilities in Parkinson disease and related cortical changes ==
=== Biomechanical alterations and influence of dopaminergic treatment ===
Posture in Parkinson' Disease

Biomechanical and motor control alterations of gait in Parkinson's patients are due to the hypokinesia which reduces the movement speed and size. The main biomechanical changes in seen in walking are: decreased or abnormal arm rotation, decreased trunk rotation, forward stooped posture, decreased movements at hip, knee and ankle joints invariably producing decreased ground clearance, excessive knee flexion throughout gait cycle, decreased stride and step length and decreased gait speed. They face problem in taking sharp turns due to decreased double support time that controls trunk momentum during the observed large swing phase and COM is closer to the limits of stability. There is marked dysrhythmicity seen bilaterally due to variability in stride and swing time. However, with higher walking speed the dysrhythmicity seen will be due to swing time as it is independent of the walking speed. During the ON phase of the Dopaminergic treatment there is increase in gait speed and step length. Cadence and the temporal variables remain unaffected by the Dopamine treatment. However, Dopamine replacements produce inherent variability in Sensorimotor system. As a result, medicated PD patients shows more variability in their gait characteristics than the nonmedicated patients especially in cadence, step time and double support time.

Cortical Changes People with Parkinson's disease due not lose their inherent ability to generate normal walking patterns but they have activation problems. There is under activation of left medial frontal area, right precuneus and left cerebellar hemisphere and over activity in left temporal cortex, right insula, left cingulate cortex and cerebellar vermis. Under activation of medial frontal areas is the main mechanism related to observed gait abnormalities. Gait disturbances can also result from decreased activation of cognitive network especially in right posterior parietal cortex. There is disruption of basal ganglia-thalamocortical loop due to striatal dopamine depletion which affects the LTP-like effect in human motor cortex. There is also reduction in ipsilateral corticocortical suppression decrease in excitability intrinsic inhibitory cortex leading to selectivity of cortical discharge during movement. Dopamine alters the regional metabolism of motor cortex leading to intracortical inhibition. This results in functional reorganization of motor maps and excessive corticostriatal synchrony when movement is initiated.

=== Freezing of Gait ===
Freezing of gait (FOG) is a major contributor of gait disturbances in Parkinson's disease. There is impairment in controlling cadence that regulates stride to stride variations in gait timing and maintaining stable walking rhythm. It is a result of various factors with combination of Hypokinesia and sequence effect, severity and variability of sequence effect, severity of festination which depends on background level Hypokinesia, response to Hypokinesia to medications and the ability to focus on gait and visual cues, extrinsic environmental or attentional demands. There is a strong relation of Freezing of gait and turning. This involves reduced mediolateral deviation, a forward COM shift and decrease step width in freezers just before FOG episodes. These hamper fluent weight shifts required while turning.

DA-loops in PD

Cortical Changes The FOG is an outcome of dynamic process of hypo and hyper activation of cortical areas such as SMA and subcortical areas like striatum, mesencephalic locomotor region and pedunculopontine nucleus. Freezing of gait during turning and walking can be due to impaired cortical regulation of motor execution and reduced ability of mesencephalic structures to flexibly compensate for that alterations. Interhemispheric connection between bilateral parietal operculum, somatosensory cortex and primary auditory area are reduced in PD people with freezing of gait. Reorganization occurs in functional connections within the locomotor network to compensate loss of connectivity between STN and SMA and loss of lower order automatic control of gait by Basal Ganglia.

== Transcranial direct current stimulation and gait rehabilitation ==
=== tDCS parameters for Parkinson Disease ===
- Polarity and Stimulation Site

21 electrodes of International 10-20 system for tDCS

Excitability changes in PD due to tDCS is not seen at greater extent with differential MEP amplitudes checked at M1 with single pulsed TMS. Anodal Stimulation of Primary Motor Cortex and Dorsal Prefrontal Cortex both seem to be involved in improving motor performance and cognitive performance in Parkinson Patients. There is also considerable effect seen after bihemispheric tDCS stimulation over left and right premotor cortex and primary motor cortex. Facilitating effects of tDCS depends on the stimulated brain areas involved and task under consideration.

- Intensity of Stimulation

Intensity of tdcs stimulation varies from 1mA-2Ma. However higher intensities produce beneficial effects to improve motor perform motor performance in Parkinson Disease. PD patients during OFF phase of medications have shown lower motor thresholds and responded to lower intensities like 1Ma. However, in ON phase 1Ma stimulation showed negative effect of anodal Tdcs on gait performance.

- Duration of stimulation

usually given for 20 mins along with the activity involved for rehabilitation. Minimum washout period of 48 hours between two tDCS sessions is kept.

- Dopamine dosage

though it is not a tdcs parameter it should be considered while its application in PD. There is clear non-linear, dosage dependent effects f dopamine in facilitatory and inhibitory plasticity and specific dopamine dosage is optimally suited to improve plasticity.

=== tDCS and Gait rehabilitation ===
- tDCS for balance and functional mobility

Anodal tDCS to dorsolateral prefrontal cortex (DLFC) results in improved balance and Functional Mobility evaluated as an outcome by Berg Balance Scale and Dynamic Gait Index. It was seen during ON phase of Dopamine supplement therapy.

Anodal tDCS to Primary motor cortex helps in UPRDS score (Unified Parkinson Disease Rating Scale), number and duration of FOG episodes FOG.

- tDCS for Dual Task and Time up and Go test

Anodal tDCS to Dorsolateral Prefrontal Cortex resulted in improved TUG score in PD during ON phase of Dopamine supplement therapy. It is usually applied 120 mins after the intake of medication.

Bilateral tDCS on Dorsolateral Prefrontal Cortex resulted in increased improvement of Dual Task involving TUG with motor and cognitive component. They showed decreased dual task cost after 2 sessions of tDCS application. However, further studies are warranted to confirm the effects of bilateral tDCS on Cognitive Dual Task measures.

- tDCS and Physical Training

Anodal tDCS stimulation of primary and pre motor cortex during the physical training aimed to improve gait initiation, stride length, gait velocity, arm swing and balance resulted in improved gait velocity and balance in comparison to tDCS stimulation alone.

Anodal tDCS to primary motor cortex with progressive lower limb resistance training may result in improving lower limb strength, postural sway, gait speed and stride variability.

Anodal tDCS applied centrally along the midline and combined with dance therapy (tango) resulted in reduced time required to complete 6M walk and 3min TUG test. There was also overall increase in gait velocity and peak pitch Trunk Velocity.

=== tDCS mechanism in Parkinson Disease ===
Transcranial Direct Current stimulation is thought to restore the neural activity in motor and prefrontal Cortices in PD. It promotes Motor learning and Consolidation and may enhance long-term retention. This is the basic rationale of using tDCS for neuro rehabilitative procedures in PD.

tDCS works on the concept of priming which depends on pre-existing neural activity referred to as homeostatic plasticity. This effect on plasticity produce persistent effects. This makes it a useful tool to be combined with another non-invasive brain stimulation technique like rTMS. Cathodal tDCS lowers the excitability of cortex thereby reversing the inhibition of low frequency rTMS whereas Anodal tDCS increases cortical excitability reversing facilitation of High frequency rTMS. Dopamine also primes the brain activity with anodal tDCS into inhibition. Though this remains to be tested.

Cortical Silent Period (CSP) reflects excitability of motor cortex involved in inhibitory circuits. IN PD CSP is shortened during OFF period and normalized on medications and lengthened in dyskinetic state. It correlates with UPDRS motor score. However, tDCS effects on CSP is not yet known.

Role of Tdcs to induce dopamine release is not yet known. As anodal tDCS is known to cause widespread activation it may trigger some effects. It is also assumed that dopamine plays a role in acute effects of Tdcs.
