= Srinivas Sridhar =

American scientist, educator and academic

- Education: California Institute of Technology (Ph.D., Physics)
- Known for: Scientific research; Academic work and education
- Awards: Biomedical Engineering Society Diversity Award (2016); American Physical Society Fellowship
- Scientific career
- Fields: Superconductivity; Neurotechnology; Metamaterials; Nanophotonics; Quantum chaos
- Workplaces: Northeastern University; Harvard Medical School; California Institute of Technology
- Website: srinivassridhar.com

Srinivas Sridhar is an American scientist, educator and academic. He is known for his research and educational activities in the area of nanomedicine, MRI, quantum chaos, superconductivity and neurotechnology. Srinivas Sridhar currently holds the position of University Distinguished Professor at Northeastern University in the Departments of Physics, Biomedical Engineering and Chemical Engineering. In 2016, Sridhar received the Biomedical Engineering Society Diversity Award. He was elected Fellow of the American Physical Society in 2008.

== Education ==
Sridhar received his PhD in physics from California Institute of Technology in 1983 under the mentorship of Professor James E. Mercereau. He was an Associate Research Scientist at UCLA from 1984 to 1986.

== Academic career and research ==
Since 1984, Sridhar's scientific and academic career has been closely associated with Northeastern University. Since 2011, Sridhar has been a visiting Lecturer at Harvard Medical School where he researches radiation oncology. He is the founding director of the Nanomedicine Innovation Center, an interdisciplinary center with research and education thrusts in nanomedicine. Sridhar is the author of over 450 publications, on his work in nanomedicine, neurotechnology, MRI, nanophotonics, nanomaterials, metamaterials, quantum chaos, superconductivity and collective excitations in materials. His paper in Nature in 2003 was listed among Breakthroughs of 2003 by the journal Science.

Sridhar has also developed innovative educational programs. Sridhar is Director and Principal Investigator of the CaNCURE cancer nano-medicine program supported by the National Institute of Health and Director of the Nanomedicine Academy and IGERT Doctoral graduate programs supported by the National Science Foundation. A distinguished academic, he served as Vice Provost for Research at Northeastern University from 2004 to 2008, overseeing the university's research portfolio.

== Selected publications ==
- PV Parimi, WT Lu, P Vodo, S Sridhar, "Imaging by flat lens using negative refraction", Nature 426 (6965), 404-404, 2003
- S Sridhar, "Experimental observation of scarred eigenfunctions of chaotic microwave cavities", Physical review letters 67 (7), 785, 1991
- S Sridhar, A Kudrolli, "Experiments on not hearing the shapeof drums", Physical review letters 72 (14), 2175, 1994
- C Versek, T Frasca, J Zhou, K Chowdhury, S Sridhar, "Electric field encephalography for brain activity monitoring", Journal of neural engineering 15 (4), 046027, 2018
- Codi A Gharagouzloo, Liam Timms, Ju Qiao, Zihang Fang, Joseph Nneji, Aniket Pandya, Praveen Kulkarni, Anne L van de Ven, Craig Ferris, Srinivas Sridhar, "Quantitative vascular neuroimaging of the rat brain using superparamagnetic nanoparticles: New insights on vascular organization and brain function", Neuroimage 163, 24–33, 2017
- PV Parimi, WT Lu, P Vodo, J Sokoloff, JS Derov, S Sridhar, "Negative refraction and left-handed electromagnetism in microwave photonic crystals", Physical review letters 92 (12), 127401, 2003
- S Sridhar, DH Wu, W Kennedy, "Temperature dependence of electrodynamic properties of YBa 2 Cu 3 O y crystals", Physical review letters 63 (17), 1873, 1989
- Tangutoori, Shifalika; Baldwin, Paige; Sridhar, Srinivas, "PARP inhibitors: A new era of targeted therapy Journal Article", Maturitas, 81 (1), pp. 5–9, 2015.
