= Excited =

Excited may refer to:

- Excited (film), a 2009 Canadian romantic comedy-drama film
- "Excited" (Little Birdy song) (2005)
- "Excited" (M People song) (1992)

== See also ==
- Excitation (disambiguation)
- Excited state, an elevation in energy level above an arbitrary baseline energy state
- Exciter (disambiguation)
