= Transcranial random noise stimulation =

Non-invasive brain stimulation technique

- Other names: tRNS

Transcranial random noise stimulation (tRNS) is a non-invasive brain stimulation technique and a form of transcranial electrical stimulation (tES). Terney et al from Göttingen University was the first group to apply tRNS in humans in 2008. They showed that by using an alternating current along with random amplitude and frequency (between 0.1 and 640 Hz) in healthy subjects, the motor cortex excitability increased (i.e. increased amplitude of motor evoked potentials) for up to 60 minutes after 10 minutes of stimulation. The study included all the frequencies up to half of the sampling rate (1280 samples/s) i.e. 640 Hz, however the positive effect was limited only to higher frequencies. Although tRNS has shown positive effects in various studies the optimal parameters, as well as the potential clinical effects of this technique, remain unclear.

== Mechanism of action ==
The physiological mechanisms underlying the effects of tRNS are not well known, however many hypotheses have been suggested. The robust changes in cortical excitability observed after tRNS could be attributed to the repeated opening of sodium channels and changes in their kinetics of activation and inactivation or to the increased sensitivity of neuronal networks to modulation. tRNS may influence cortical oscillations, leading to changes in excitability. These proposed mechanisms are consistent with the observation that reversing electrode polarities in tRNS does not interfere with the augmentation in cortical excitability, suggesting that tRNS-induced cortical excitability is independent of current flow direction.

Since tRNS is a repetitive, random, and subthreshold stimulation, it is speculated that tRNS induces direct temporal summation of neural activity because the time constant of a neuron is sufficiently long to permit the summation of two stimuli presented in close succession.

The effects of tRNS may also be explained in the context of the stochastic resonance phenomenon. tRNS is, by definition, a stimulation that induces non-finalized random activity in the system (i.e., noise). The presence of neuronal noise might enhance the sensitivity of the neurons to a given range of weak inputs

== Comparison with other tES techniques ==
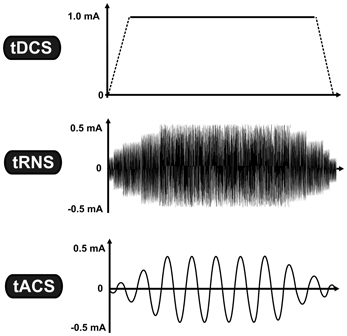
While tDCS uses constant current intensity, tRNS and tACS use oscillating current. The vertical axis represents the current intensity in milliamp (mA), while the horizontal axis illustrates the time-course.

Transcranial electrical stimulation (tES) generally includes the following techniques:

- Transcranial alternating current stimulation (tACS)
- Transcranial direct current stimulation (tDCS)
- Transcranial random noise stimulation (tRNS)
- Transcranial pulsed current stimulation (tPCS)

tRNS stimulation differs from tDCS in that instead of constant direct current delivery, current levels are randomly generated, with a normal distribution around a specific mean intensity. Other parameters related to the stimulation electrodes, like position and size, are similar to tDCS. Compared to tDCS, tRNS has also the advantage of being more comfortable, which makes it potentially advantageous for setting and blinding studies. tRNS is easier to blind than tDCS with the 50% perception threshold for tDCS at 400 μA while this threshold was at 1200 μA in the case of tRNS.

tACS (transcranial alternating current stimulation) is a frequency-specific stimulation method that is also thought to influence oscillatory neuronal activity. This method differs from tRNS in that a sinusoidal current is applied at a fixed frequency rather than a randomly presented range of frequencies. Often, tACS is applied at frequencies that mirror the predominant frequency bands observed in EEG in different regions of the brain.

== See also ==
- Neuromodulation
- Neurotechnology
- Neurostimulation
- Transcranial magnetic stimulation (TMS)
