= Neuronetics =

American neuromodulation company

Neuronetics, Inc.
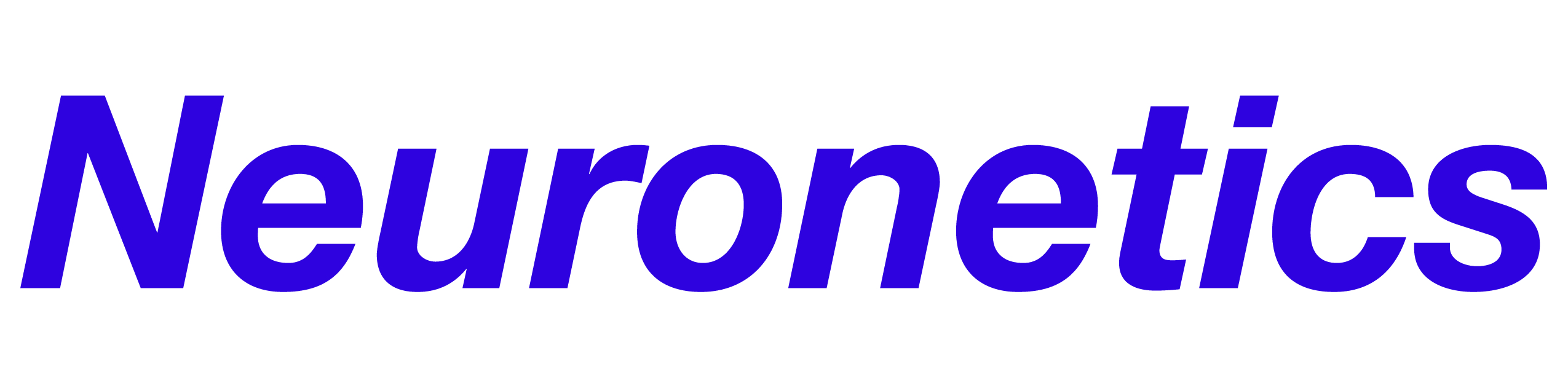
- Type: Public
- Traded as: Nasdaq: STIM; Russell 2000 Index component
- Founded: 2003
- Headquarters: Malvern, PA, United States
- Key people: Dan Reuvers (President and CEO) Stephen Furlong (CFO) Andrew Macan (General counsel)
- Number of employees: 167; As of March 31, 2018
- Website: neurostar.com

Neuronetics is a Malvern, PA based, publicly traded company incorporated in Delaware in April 2003, that develops non-invasive treatments for psychiatric disorders that have shown resistance or lack of improvement using traditional medicine. The treatments are based upon neuromodulation technology.

Neuronetics became the "first and only Food and Drug Administration (FDA) approval for the clinical treatment of a specific form of medication-refractory depression using a TMS Therapy device (FDA approval K061053)."

They manufacture a transcranial magnetic stimulation device, NeuroStar. The NeuroStar TMS therapy is delivered via a precisely positioned magnetic coil against the patient's head.
