= My Beautiful Broken Brain =

- Netflix poster of My Beautiful Broken Brain
- Directed by: Sophie Robinson; Lotje Sodderland
- Produced by: Sophie Robinson
- Distributed by: Netflix
- Release date: 21 November 2014 (IDFA)
- Running time: 84 minutes
- Country: United Kingdom
- Language: English

My Beautiful Broken Brain is a 2014 documentary film about the life of 34-year-old Lotje Sodderland after she suffered a hemorrhagic stroke as a result of a congenital vascular malformation in November 2011, initially experiencing aphasia, the complete loss of her ability to read, write, or speak coherently.

David Lynch became an executive producer of the film.

== Content ==
The film starts with a recap of the intracerebral haemorrhage (stroke) and subsequent emergency brain surgery on her parietal and temporal lobes, and follows the life of its protagonist, London resident Lotje Sodderland, in the year that followed, documenting the progress of her recovery and the major setbacks she experienced.

Lotje covers some of the daily challenges that she experienced after sustaining injury to her brain through the stroke, not just with dysphasia and apraxia while communicating through expressive verbal language, reading and writing, but also the memory deficits, confusion, cognitive processing and sensory perception changes, over-sensitivity to noise and the sensations of overwhelm, fatigue, frustration, and at times discouragement about the future considering the changes in her life. This documentary prominently features the valuable support her family and friends provided during her recovery. Through extensive in-patient and out-patient rehabilitation that included occupational therapy, speech therapy, visits with both a psychologist and psychiatrist, she makes a profound recovery, despite the post-seizure regression experienced following the experimental transcranial magnetic stimulation (TMS) treatments.

Lotje began recording video-selfies just a few days after the stroke, while still in the hospital. Large parts of the film consist of material she filmed on her iPhone. This, along with sequences showing the world from her point-of-view at the time, including, for example, visual misperceptions (hallucinations), creates a personal storytelling style.

== Production ==
The film was initiated by its protagonist herself. According to her, making a film about her struggles was the first linear thought she had after the stroke. She started taking video-selfies while still in hospital, and two weeks later contacted documentary filmmaker Sophie Robinson to enlist her help.

Funding for editing and post-production was collected via Kickstarter between November 28 and December 20, 2013. The initial goal of £30,000 was exceeded by £7340.

== Release ==
My Beautiful Broken Brain had its world premiere at the 2014 International Documentary Film Festival Amsterdam, where it won the DOC U award.

Netflix started streaming the film as a Netflix Original worldwide on March 18, 2016.
