= Neuromonics =

Non-invasive sound therapy

- Specialty: Audiology

Neuromonics is a non-invasive sound therapy used to manage tinnitus. The therapy involves a customized acoustic stimulus delivered through headphones for a prescribed amount of time each day. It is typically used as part of a comprehensive tinnitus management program that includes counselling, education, and support. Neuromonics has been shown to significantly reduce the impact of tinnitus on daily life for many patients.

== Overview ==
Neuromonics is a patented treatment for tinnitus that combines acoustic stimulation with cognitive-behavioural therapy to provide relief for people suffering from tinnitus. The treatment aims to retrain the brain to filter out the sounds of tinnitus, making them less noticeable and bothersome. The treatment was developed by audiologist Dr. Paul Davis.

== Treatment process ==
The initial assessment involves a thorough evaluation of the patient's tinnitus as well as their hearing and medical history. Based on the assessment, a customized sound-therapy program is created that includes a series of audio tracks designed to provide a specific sound stimulation tailored to the individual's tinnitus.

The device fitting stage involves fitting the patient with a small, portable device that plays the customized audio tracks. The device is worn for several hours a day over a period of several months. Ongoing support and counselling are also provided throughout the treatment process to help patients cope with their tinnitus and to make any necessary adjustments to the sound-therapy program.

== Effectiveness ==
Several studies have found Neuromonics to be an effective treatment for tinnitus. A randomized controlled trial published in the Journal of the American Academy of Audiology found that Neuromonics treatment resulted in significant reductions in tinnitus severity, as well as improvements in overall quality of life, compared to a control group that received no treatment. This study does not isolate the impact of sound therapy alone from the effects of counselling that were given simultaneously, however, and the study sample size was relatively small. While some studies have reported positive outcomes, not all research has found Neuromonics to be effective, underscoring the necessity for further investigation to comprehensively evaluate its effectiveness as a treatment for tinnitus.

== Safety ==
While Neuromonics treatment is generally considered safe, it may not be appropriate for all patients. Potential side effects may include temporary exacerbation of tinnitus symptoms, headache, or ear discomfort. Patients considering Neuromonics treatment should consult with a qualified audiologist or other healthcare professional to determine whether the treatment is appropriate for their specific needs.
