= Excitation =

Excitation, excite, exciting, or excitement may refer to:

- Excitation (magnetic), provided with an electrical generator or alternator
- Exite, a series of racing video games published by Nintendo starting with Excitebike
- Excite (web portal), defunct web portal owned by IAC
- Excite Ballpark, located in San Jose, California
- Increase of energy to an excited state of a quantum system such as an atom, molecule or nucleus
  - Electron excitation, the transfer of an electron to a higher atomic orbital
  - More generally, the transfer of energy to a normal mode
- Excitement (film), a lost 1924 silent comedy by Robert F. Hill
- Sexual excitation
- Stimulation or excitation or excitement, the action of various agents on nerves, muscles, or a sensory end organ, by which activity is evoked
- "Exciting", a song by Hieroglyphics from the album The Kitchen

== See also ==
- Anticipation (emotion)
- Anxiety
- Endorphins
- Excitatory postsynaptic potential
- Excited (disambiguation)
- Exciter (disambiguation)
- Pleasure
- Psychomotor agitation
