= Transcranial magnetic stimulation =

Brain stimulation using magnetic fields

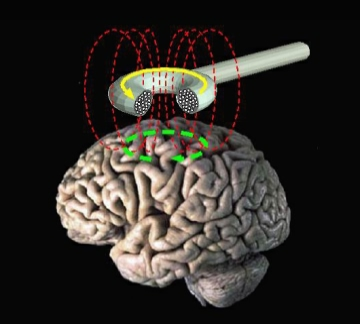
- Transcranial magnetic stimulation (schematic diagram)
- Specialty: Psychiatry, neurology
- MeSH: D050781

Transcranial magnetic stimulation (TMS) is a noninvasive neurostimulation technique in which a changing magnetic field is used to induce an electric current in a targeted area of the brain through electromagnetic induction. A device called a stimulator generates electric pulses that are delivered to a magnetic coil placed against the scalp. The resulting magnetic field penetrates the skull and induces a secondary electric current in the underlying brain tissue, modulating neural activity.

Medical devices delivering repetitive transcranial magnetic stimulation (rTMS) appear to provide reasonably safe and effective treatments for major depressive disorder (MDD), chronic pain, and obsessive–compulsive disorder (OCD). However, evidence quality is variable, effect sizes are modest, and placebo responses are large; the extent of its efficacy and optimal treatment protocols are not certain.

Adverse effects of TMS appear rare and include fainting and seizure, which occur in roughly 0.1% of patients and are usually attributable to administration error.

== Medical uses ==
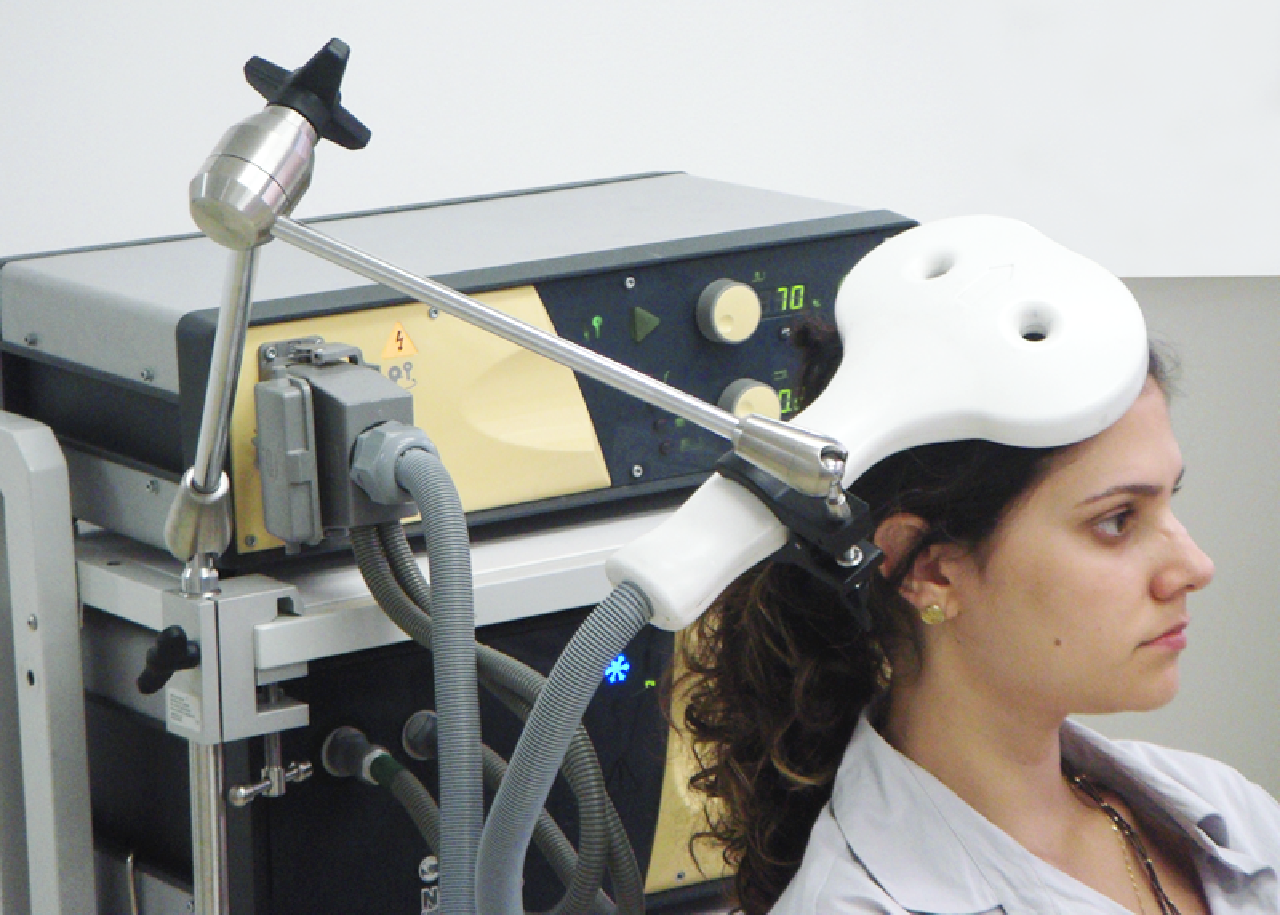
A magnetic coil is positioned on the patient's head.

TMS does not require surgery or electrode implantation. Its use can be diagnostic and/or therapeutic. Effects vary based on frequency and intensity of the magnetic pulses as well as the length of treatment, which dictates the total number of pulses given.

The Food and Drug Administration (FDA) has cleared rTMS devices for use in the treatment of depression in the United States (US). The National Institute for Health and Care Excellence (NICE) has issued guidance in the United Kingdom (UK) for that use. Private clinics and some Veterans Affairs medical centers provide treatments for that use. TMS stimulates cortical tissue without the pain sensations produced in transcranial electrical stimulation.

=== Diagnosis ===
TMS can be used clinically to measure activity and function of specific brain circuits in humans, most commonly with single or paired magnetic pulses. The most widely accepted use is in measuring the connection between the primary motor cortex of the central nervous system and the peripheral nervous system to evaluate damage related to past or progressive neurologic insult. TMS has utility as a diagnostic instrument for myelopathy, amyotrophic lateral sclerosis, and multiple sclerosis.

=== Treatment and efficacy ===
The FDA has found that devices producing rTMS are reasonably safe and effective for the treatment of MDD, chronic pain, and OCD; only minor adverse effects have usually accompanied these improvements. Guidelines issued through 2018 have claimed that TMS has shown strong evidence of effectiveness for depression, neuropathic pain, and post-stroke motor recovery, probable benefit for several other conditions, and insufficient evidence for the rest. Newer modalities of TMS, such as intermittent theta burst stimulation (iTBS), appear to match standard rTMS in efficacy while offering shorter treatment times and promising avenues for further optimization. rTMS had a large effect size advantage over sham for depression (Hedges's g = 0.791) in a 2023 meta-analysis.

Existing evidence suggests that rTMS, particularly targeting the dorsolateral prefrontal cortex (DLPFC) and the supplementary motor area, reduces OCD symptoms. Results for the medial prefrontal cortex and anterior cingulate cortex using deep transcranial magnetic stimulation are more variable; the overall heterogeneity of studies highlights the need for further research.

However, the effectiveness of rTMS and the quality of evidence behind it for treatment of depression have long been questioned. A 2023 re-analysis of 15 meta-analyses on TMS for major depression found that treatment effects vary widely, many reviews have a high risk of bias, and the apparent safety and efficacy of TMS may be overstated. As with antidepressants and other interventions for depression, there is a large placebo response with sham control groups in rTMS trials (Hedges's g = 0.8).

A 2011 review found that only 13.5% of 96 randomized control studies of rTMS to the DLPFC had reported blinding success and that, in those studies, people in real rTMS groups were significantly more likely to think that they had received real rTMS, compared with those in sham rTMS groups. Depending on the research question asked and the experimental design, matching the discomforts of rTMS (such as muscle twitching and pain) to distinguish the true effects of treatments from those of placebos can be an important and challenging issue.

Two pivotal clinical trials led to the first FDA marketing authorizations for rTMS devices indicated for use in treatment-resistant MDD in 2011 and 2013. While the results of both trials reportedly had statistical significance at 6 weeks post-treatment, interventions outperformed sham by means of only 2 to 3 points on the 60-point Montgomery–Åsberg Depression Rating Scale (MADRS). In the primary outcome measure for the second such trial, there were only 18 remitters (9.5% of the intention-to-treat population): 14.1% in the active treatment arm and 5.1% in the sham treatment arm. The odds ratio for the remitters was 4.2; 95% confidence interval, 1.32–13.24; p = 0.02. The number needed to treat (the average number of patients who need to be treated to prevent one additional bad outcome) was 12.

== Adverse effects ==
TMS is generally advertised as a safe alternative to medications such as SSRIs. The greatest immediate risk from TMS is fainting, though this is uncommon. Seizures have been reported, but are rare.

Risks are higher for therapeutic rTMS than for single or paired diagnostic TMS. Adverse effects generally increase with higher frequency stimulation.

== Procedure ==
During the procedure, a magnetic coil is positioned at the head of the person receiving the treatment using anatomical landmarks on the skull, in particular the inion and nasion. The coil is then connected to a pulse generator, or stimulator, that delivers electric current to the coil.

== Physics ==
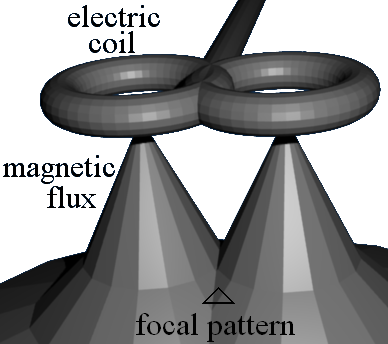

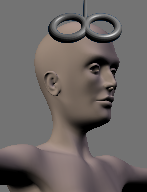
TMS – butterfly coils

TMS uses electromagnetic induction to generate an electric current across the scalp and skull. A plastic-enclosed coil of wire is held next to the skull and when activated, produces a varying magnetic field oriented orthogonally to the plane of the coil. The changing magnetic field then induces an electric current in the brain that activates nearby nerve cells in a manner similar to a current applied superficially at the cortical surface.

The magnetic field is about the same strength as magnetic resonance imaging (MRI), and the pulse generally reaches no more than 5 centimeters into the brain unless using a modified coil and technique for deeper stimulation.

Transcranial magnetic stimulation is achieved by quickly discharging current from a large capacitor into a coil to produce pulsed magnetic fields between 2 and 3 teslas in strength. Directing the magnetic field pulse at a targeted area in the brain causes a localized electrical current which can then either depolarize or hyperpolarize neurons at that site. The induced electric field inside the brain tissue causes a change in transmembrane potentials resulting in depolarization or hyperpolarization of neurons, causing them to be more or less excitable, respectively.

TMS usually stimulates to a depth from 2 to 4 cm below the surface, depending on the coil and intensity used. Consequently, only superficial brain areas can be affected. Deep TMS can reach up to 6 cm into the brain to stimulate deeper layers of the motor cortex, such as that which controls leg motion. The path of this current can be difficult to model because the brain is irregularly shaped with variable internal density and water content, leading to a nonuniform magnetic field strength and conduction throughout its tissues.

=== Frequency and duration ===
The effects of TMS can be divided based on frequency, duration and intensity (amplitude) of stimulation:

- Single or paired pulse TMS causes neurons in the neocortex under the site of stimulation to depolarize and discharge an action potential. If used in the primary motor cortex, it produces muscle activity referred to as a motor evoked potential (MEP) which can be recorded on electromyography (EMG). If used on the occipital cortex, 'phosphenes' (flashes of light) might be perceived by the subject. In most other areas of the cortex, there is no conscious effect, but behavior may be altered (e.g., slower reaction time on a cognitive task), or changes in brain activity may be detected using diagnostic equipment.
- rTMS produces longer-lasting effects that persist past the period of stimulation. rTMS can increase or decrease the excitability of the corticospinal tract depending on the intensity of stimulation, coil orientation, and frequency. Low frequency rTMS with a stimulus frequency less than 1 Hz is believed to inhibit cortical firing, while a stimulus frequency greater than 1 Hz, referred to as high frequency, is believed to provoke it. Though its mechanism is not clear, it has been suggested as being due to a change in synaptic efficacy related to long-term potentiation (LTP) and long-term depression like plasticity (LTD-like plasticity).

=== Coil types ===
Most devices use a coil shaped like a figure-eight to deliver a shallow magnetic field that affects more superficial neurons in the brain. Differences in magnetic coil design are considered when comparing results, with important elements including the type of material, geometry and specific characteristics of the associated magnetic pulse.

The core material may be either a magnetically inert substrate ('air core'), or a solid, ferromagnetically active material ('solid core'). Solid cores result in more efficient transfer of electrical energy to a magnetic field and reduce energy loss to heat, and so can be operated with the higher volume of therapy protocols without interruption due to overheating. Varying the geometric shape of the coil itself can cause variations in focality, shape, and depth of penetration. Differences in coil material and its power supply also affect magnetic pulse width and duration.

A number of different types of coils exist, each of which produce different magnetic fields. The round coil is the original used in TMS. Later, the figure-eight (butterfly) coil was developed to provide a more focal pattern of activation in the brain, and the four-leaf coil for focal stimulation of peripheral nerves. The double-cone coil conforms more to the shape of the head. The Hesed (H-core), circular crown and double cone coils allow more widespread activation and a deeper magnetic penetration. They are supposed to impact deeper areas in the motor cortex and cerebellum controlling the legs and pelvic floor, for example, though the increased depth comes at the cost of a less focused magnetic pulse.

== Research directions ==
TMS is oftentimes combined with electroencephalography (EEG) to assess functional connectivity. Low-profile electrodes have been developed for concurrent TMS–EEG in order to reduce mechanical coupling and maintain stable contact during stimulation; one example is the ultra-flat TMS–EEG electrode g.Ladybird, developed by g.tec medical engineering GmbH, an Austria-based neurotechnology company.

For Parkinson's disease, early results suggest that low frequency stimulation may have an effect on medication associated dyskinesia, and that high frequency stimulation improves motor function.

The cerebellar cortex as a possible target of TMS has been investigated in combination with EMG, and a reduction in the average amplitude of motor-evoked-potentials in small hand muscles has been observed when comparing paired-pulse TMS with a 6-8 ms interstimulus interval between cerebellar TMS and TMS to the primary motor cortex with single-pulse TMS to the primary motor cortex - a phenomenon termed cerebellum brain inhibition (CBI). Recent investigations have built upon this phenomenon to investigate the feasibility of combining EEG with cerebellar TMS to find signatures of the cerebellum-to-cerebrum functional connectivity in high temporal resultion. By applying control conditions accounting for multisensory input and concomitant occipital cortex stimulation, and confirming effective cerebellar TMS by assessing CBI beforehand and modelling the induced electric field, EEG signatures of cerebellar TMS were proposed - as they may be utilized as therapeutic biomarkers to test pharmacotherapy efficacy in spinocerebellar ataxia in the future. However, these EEG signatures are still openly debated in the field of Brain Stimulation due to their inconsistency - likely, differing stimulation targets due to the lack of neuronavigation in these studies explain these discrepancies in results.

== History ==
Luigi Galvani (1737–1798) undertook research on the effects of electricity on the body in the late-eighteenth century and laid the foundations for the field of electrophysiology. In the 1830s, Michael Faraday (1791–1867) discovered that an electrical current had a corresponding magnetic field, and that changing one could induce its counterpart.

Work to directly stimulate the human brain with electricity started in the late 1800s, and by the 1930s the Italian physicians Cerletti and Bini had developed electroconvulsive therapy (ECT). ECT became widely used to treat mental illness, and ultimately overused, as it began to be seen as a panacea. This led to a backlash in the 1970s.

In 1980, Merton and Morton successfully used transcranial electrical stimulation (TES) to stimulate the motor cortex. However, this process was very uncomfortable, and subsequently Anthony T. Barker began to search for an alternative to TES. He began exploring the use of magnetic fields to alter electrical signaling within the brain, and the first stable TMS devices were developed in 1985. They were originally intended as diagnostic and research devices, with evaluation of their therapeutic potential being a later development. The FDA first cleared a TMS device for marketing in December 2009.

== Regulatory status ==
As of January 2026, the FDA had authorized under two regulatory pathways the marketing of more than 50 TMS devices for various indications of use within the United States. These pathways are (1) the premarket notification (PMN), also known as a 510(k) submission, and (2) the de novo classification request.

The FDA clears medical devices for marketing under a PMN if it finds that the intended use and technological characteristics of a new device are "substantially equivalent" to a legally marketed device (termed a "predicate device"). The FDA also clears medical devices for marketing under a PMN if it finds that (1) a new device has the same intended use as the predicate and has different technological characteristics, (2) the information submitted to the FDA does not raise new types of questions of safety and effectiveness, and (3) the information demonstrates that the new device has a comparable risk-to-benefit profile to a legally marketed device. The agency grants de novo classification requests if it finds that the data and information provided demonstrate that general controls or general and special controls are adequate to provide a reasonable assurance of safety and effectiveness, and the probable benefits of the device outweigh the probable risks. Among the devices authorized for marketing under these two pathways are:

=== Speech mapping prior to neurosurgery ===
In December 2009, in response to a PMN, the Finnish company Nexstim OY obtained FDA clearance for the Nexstim eXimia Navigated Brain Stimulation System for the non-invasive mapping of the primary motor cortex of the brain to its cortical gyrus for the assessment of the primary motor cortex for pre-procedural planning. In May 2012, in response to a subsequent PMN, the company obtained such clearance for the Nexstim Navigational Brain Stimulation System 4 and the Nexstim NBS System 4 with NEXSPEECH® for the localization and assessment of cortical areas of speech function for pre-procedural planning purposes.

=== Depression ===
In July 2011, in response to a petition by the US company, Neuronetics, Inc., the FDA classified under its de novo classification pathway the NeuroStar TMS System as a Class II (moderate risk) medical device for the treatment of MDD in patients who have failed to receive benefit from one antidepressant trial.

In January 2013, in response to a PMN by the Israeli company, Brainsway, Ltd., the FDA cleared the Brainsway Deep TMS System for the treatment of depressive episodes in adult patients suffering from MDD who failed to achieve satisfactory improvement from previous antidepressant medication treatment in the current episode.

In May 2015, in response to a PMN by the UK company, The Magstim Company Ltd., the FDA cleared the Rapid2 Therapy System for the treatment of MDD in adult patients who have failed to achieve satisfactory improvement from prior antidepressant medication in the current episode.

In September 2021, in response to a PMN by The Magstim Company Ltd., the FDA cleared the Horizon 3.0 TMS Therapy System for the treatment of MDD in adult patients who have failed to achieve satisfactory improvement from prior antidepressant medication in the current episode.

In September 2022, in response to a PMN by the US company Magnus Medical, Inc., the FDA cleared the Magnus Neuromodulation System with SAINT Technology, the first accelerated rTMS protocol cleared for treatment-resistant depression.

In March 2023, in response to a PMN by The Magstim Company Ltd., the FDA cleared the Horizon 3.0 TMS Therapy System for the treatment of depressive episodes and for decreasing anxiety symptoms for those who may exhibit comorbid anxiety symptoms in adult patients suffering from MDD and who have failed to achieve satisfactory improvement from prior antidepressant medication in the current episode.

In October 2023, in response to a PMN by The Magstim Company Ltd., the FDA cleared the Horizon 3.0 TMS Therapy System for the treatment of MDD in adult patients who have failed to achieve satisfactory improvement from prior antidepressant medication in the current episode, as well as an adjunct for the treatment of adult patients suffering from OCD.

=== Headache ===
In March 2013, in response to a request by the US company eNeura Therapuetics LLC, the FDA classified under its de novo classification pathway as a Class II medical device the eNeura Therapeutics® CerenaTM Transcranial Magnetic Stimulator for the acute treatment of pain associated with migraine headache with aura.

=== Obsessive–compulsive disorder (OCD) ===
In September 2017, the FDA classified the Brainsway Deep Transcranial Magnetic Stimulation System as an adjunct for the treatment of adult patients suffering from OCD as a Class II medical device under its de novo classification pathway in response to a request from Brainsway Ltd. In August 2018, the FDA permitted the marketing of the device for the treatment of OCD in response to a subsequent de novo classification request from the company.

In August 2020, the FDA cleared the MagVenture TMS Therapy system for the treatment of OCD in response to a PMN by the Danish company Tonica Elektronik A/S.

In May 2022, the FDA cleared the NeuroStar Advanced Therapy for the adjunctive treatment of OCD in response to a PMN by Neuronetics, Inc.

In October 2023, in response to a PMN by The Magstim Company Ltd., the FDA cleared the Horizon 3.0 TMS Therapy System for the treatment of MDD in adult patients who have failed to achieve satisfactory improvement from prior antidepressant medication in the current episode, as well as an adjunct for the treatment of adult patients suffering from OCD.

=== Psychiatric disorders and conditions ===
In August 2018, in response to a request by Brainsway Ltd., the FDA classified under its de novo classification pathway the generic type of device transcranial magnetic stimulation system for neurological and psychiatric disorders and conditions as a Class II medical device that is identified as a prescription, non-implantable device that uses brief duration, rapidly alternating, or pulsed, magnetic fields to induce neural activity in the cerebral cortex.

=== Smoking cessation ===
In August 2020, the FDA cleared the Brainsway Deep TMS System for use as an aid in short term smoking cessation in adults in response to a PMN by Brainsway Ltd.

=== Criticism of FDA regulatory procedures for medical devices ===
In 1993, the US House of Representatives' Subcommittee on Oversight and Investigations of its Committee on Energy and Commerce issued a report entitled "Less Than The Sum Of Its Parts". The report identified a number of continued organizational and structural weaknesses that had made the FDA Center for Devices and Radiological Health unable to either adequately protect the public from unsafe devices or to approve useful and safe devices in a reasonable period of time. A 2010 review of the FDA's regulatory procedures subsequently contended that, among other things, the agency's reviews of medical devices had a lower approval standard than their drug counterparts, excessively relied upon a fast-track process, and failed to conduct Congressionally-mandated device classifications.

==== Other areas ====
In the European Economic Area, various versions of deep TMS H-coils have CE marking for Alzheimer's disease, autism, bipolar disorder, epilepsy, chronic pain, MDD, Parkinson's disease, PTSD, schizophrenia (negative symptoms) and to aid smoking cessation. One review found tentative benefit for cognitive enhancement in healthy people.

=== Coverage by health services and insurers ===
==== United Kingdom ====
The United Kingdom's NICE issues guidance to the National Health Service (NHS) in England, Wales, Scotland, and Northern Ireland. NICE guidance does not address whether the NHS should fund a procedure. Local NHS bodies (primary care trusts and hospital trusts) make decisions about funding after considering the clinical effectiveness of the procedure and whether the procedure represents value for money for the NHS.

NICE evaluated TMS for severe depression in 2007, finding that TMS was safe, but with insufficient evidence for its efficacy. Guidance was updated and replaced in 2015, concluding that evidence for short‑term efficacy of rTMS for depression was adequate, although the clinical response is variable, and ruling that rTMS for depression may be used with arrangements for clinical governance and audit.

In January 2014, NICE reported the results of an evaluation of TMS for treating and preventing migraine (IPG 477). NICE found that short-term TMS is safe but there is insufficient evidence to evaluate safety for long-term and frequent uses. It found that evidence on the efficacy of TMS for the treatment of migraine is limited in quantity, that evidence for the prevention of migraine is limited in both quality and quantity.

As of 2025, use of rTMS in the UK was reported to have remained limited due to the cost of equipment and establishing treatment centres. Camilla Nord, head of the Mental Health Neuroscience Lab at the University of Cambridge said, "The NHS has unfortunately been far behind the US and Canada on rTMS, which is at least as effective as antidepressants, if not more".

==== United States ====
Commercial health insurance

In 2013, several commercial health insurance plans in the United States, including Anthem, Health Net, Kaiser Permanente, and Blue Cross Blue Shield of Nebraska and of Rhode Island, covered TMS for the treatment of depression for the first time. In contrast, UnitedHealthcare issued a medical policy for TMS in 2013 that stated there is insufficient evidence that the procedure is beneficial for health outcomes in patients with depression. UnitedHealthcare noted that methodological concerns raised about the scientific evidence studying TMS for depression include small sample size, lack of a validated sham comparison in randomized controlled studies, and variable uses of outcome measures. Other commercial insurance plans whose 2013 medical coverage policies stated that the role of TMS in the treatment of depression and other disorders had not been clearly established or remained investigational included Aetna, Cigna and Regence.

Medicare

Policies for Medicare coverage vary among local jurisdictions within the Medicare system, and Medicare coverage for TMS has varied among jurisdictions and with time. For example:

- In early 2012 in New England, Medicare covered TMS for the first time in the United States. However, that jurisdiction later decided to end coverage after October, 2013.
- In August 2012, the jurisdiction covering Arkansas, Louisiana, Mississippi, Colorado, Texas, Oklahoma, and New Mexico determined that there was insufficient evidence to cover the treatment, but the same jurisdiction subsequently determined that Medicare would cover TMS for the treatment of depression after December 2013.

== Limitations ==
There are serious concerns about stimulating brain tissue using non-invasive magnetic field methods such as uncertainty in the dose and localisation of the stimulation effect.

== See also ==
- Cortical stimulation mapping
- Cranial electrotherapy stimulation
- Electrical brain stimulation
- Electroconvulsive therapy
- Low field magnetic stimulation
- My Beautiful Broken Brain
- Neuromodulation
- Neurostimulation
- Neurotechnology
- Non-invasive cerebellar stimulation
- Transcranial alternating current stimulation
- Transcranial direct-current stimulation
- Transcranial random noise stimulation
- Vagus nerve stimulation
