= Non-invasive procedure =

Medical procedure involving no break in skin

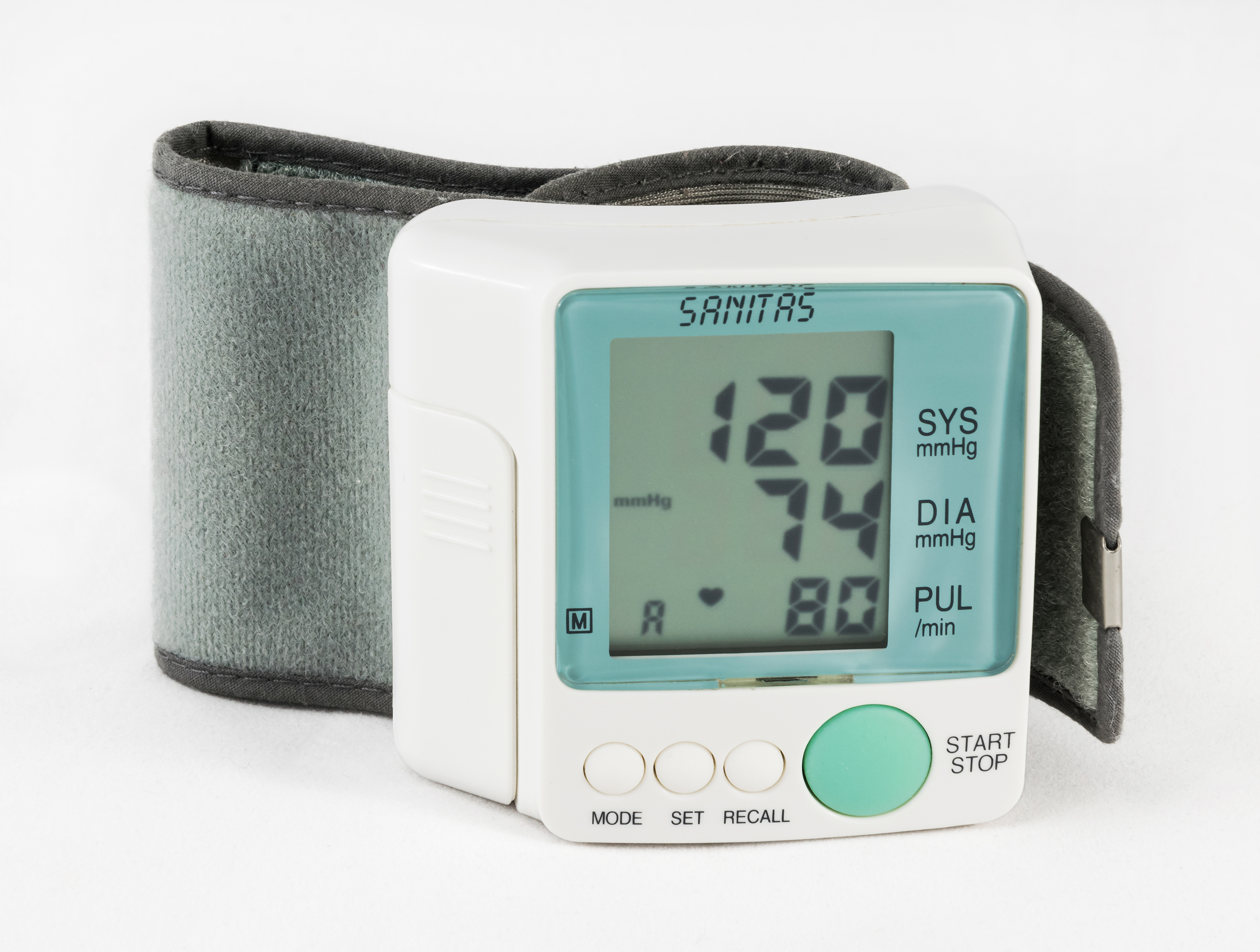
Electronic blood pressure monitor

A medical procedure is defined as non-invasive when no break in the skin is created and there is no contact with the mucosa, or skin break, or internal body cavity beyond a natural or artificial body orifice. For example, deep palpation and percussion are non-invasive but a rectal examination is invasive. Likewise, examination of the ear-drum or inside the nose or a wound dressing change all fall outside the definition of non-invasive procedure. There are many non-invasive procedures, ranging from simple observation, to specialised forms of surgery, such as radiosurgery. Extracorporeal shock wave lithotripsy is a non-invasive treatment of stones in the kidney, gallbladder or liver, using an acoustic pulse. For centuries, physicians have employed many simple non-invasive methods based on physical parameters in order to assess body function in health and disease (physical examination and inspection), such as pulse-taking, the auscultation of heart sounds and lung sounds (using the stethoscope), temperature examination (using thermometers), respiratory examination, peripheral vascular examination, oral examination, abdominal examination, external percussion and palpation, blood pressure measurement (using the sphygmomanometer), change in body volumes (using plethysmograph), audiometry, eye examination, and many others.

== Diagnostic images ==
- Bioluminescence imaging
- Dermatoscopy
- Diffuse optical tomography
- Gamma camera
- Computed tomography
- Infrared imaging of the body
- Magnetic resonance elastography
- Magnetic resonance imaging
- Magnetic resonance spectroscopy
- Optical coherence tomography
- Posturography
- Radiography, fluoroscopy
- Ultrasonography and echocardiography

== Diagnostic signals ==
- Electrocardiography
- Electroencephalography
- Electromyography
- Photoplethysmograph
- Electrical impedance tomography
- Electroneuronography
- Electroretinography
- Electronystagmography
- Magnetoencephalography
- Evoked potentials
- Impedance phlebography
- Nuclear magnetic resonance

== Therapy ==
- Acoustic photonic intellectual neurostimulation (APIN)
- Blood irradiation therapy
- Cytoluminescent therapy
- Epidermal radioisotope therapy
- Radiation therapy
- Brachytherapy
- Light therapy (phototherapy)
- Lithotripsy
- Defibrillation
- Biofeedback
- Oxygen therapy
- Non-invasive ventilation
- VPAP
- BIPAP
- Neurally adjusted ventilatory assist
- Biphasic cuirass ventilation
- Laser therapy
- Low level laser therapy
- Magnetic resonance therapy
- Magnet therapy
- Photodynamic therapy
- Photothermal therapy
- Pulsed electromagnetic field therapy
- PUVA therapy
- Repetitive transcranial magnetic stimulation (rTMS)
- Therapeutic ultrasound
- Transcranial alternating current stimulation (tACS)
- Transcranial direct current stimulation (tDCS)
- Transcranial magnetic stimulation
- Transcranial pulsed current stimulation (tPCS)
- Transcranial pulsed electromagnetic fields (tPEMF)
- Transcranial random noise stimulation (tRNS)
- Neuromonics
- Ultraviolet light therapy

== See also ==
- Minimally invasive procedures
