= Transcranial direct-current stimulation =

Technique of brain electric stimulation therapy

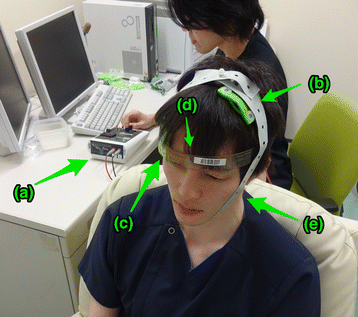
- Anodal tDCS administration. Anodal (b) and cathodal (c) electrodes with 35 cm^{2} size are put on F3 and right supraorbital region, respectively. A head strap is used (d) for convenience and reproducibility, and a rubber band (e) for reducing resistance.
- MeSH: D065908

Transcranial direct current stimulation (tDCS) is a form of neuromodulation that uses constant, low-intensity DC electricity delivered via electrodes placed along on the scalp. This type of neurotherapy was originally developed to help patients with brain injuries or neuropsychiatric conditions such as major depressive disorder. It can be contrasted with cranial electrotherapy stimulation, which generally uses alternating current the same way, as well as transcranial magnetic stimulation.

Research shows increasing evidence for tDCS as a treatment for depression. There is emerging supportive evidence for tDCS in the management of schizophrenia – especially for negative symptoms. There is mixed evidence about whether tDCS is useful for cognitive enhancement in healthy people. There is no strong evidence that tDCS is useful for memory deficits in Parkinson's disease and Alzheimer's disease, non-neuropathic pain, nor for improving arm or leg functioning and muscle strength in people recovering from a stroke.

== Efficacy ==
=== Depression ===
There is some evidence tDCS might be of moderate benefit as treatment for mild and moderate depression, major depressive disorder and treatment-resistant depression. These depressive episodes use hypo activity and hyper activity. Hypo on the left dorsolateral prefrontal cortex and hyper in the right. Some use guidelines like probable efficacy for non-drug resistant depression.

=== Other medical use ===
Recent research on tDCS has shown promising results in treating other mental health conditions such as anxiety and PTSD. More research is required on the topic. There is also evidence that tDCS is useful in treating neuropathic pain after spinal cord injury. There is evidence of very low to moderate quality that tDCS can improve activities of daily living assessment in the short-term after stroke.

Transcranial direct-current stimulation is also used to augment speech therapy in patients with acquired language disorders like aphasia, or to help maintain language abilities in the case of primary progressive aphasia, a neurodegenerative condition.

== Safety ==
According to the British National Institute for Health and Care Excellence (NICE), the evidence on tDCS for depression raises no major safety concerns.

As of 2017, at stimulation up to 60 min and up to 4 mA over two weeks, adverse effects include skin irritation, a phosphene at the start of stimulation, nausea, headache, dizziness, and itching under the electrode. Typical treatment sessions lasting for about 20–30 min repeated daily for several weeks in the treatment of depression. Adverse effects of long term treatment were not known as of 2017. Nausea most commonly occurs when the electrodes are placed above the mastoid for stimulation of the vestibular system. A phosphene is a brief flash of light that can occur if an electrode is placed near the eye.

People susceptible to seizures, such as people with epilepsy should not receive tDCS. Studies have been completed to determine the current density at which overt brain damage occurs in rats. It was found that in cathodal stimulation, a current density of 142.9 A/m^{2} delivering a charge density of 52400 C/m^{2} or higher caused a brain lesion in the rat. This is over two orders of magnitude higher than protocols that were in use as of 2009.

== Mechanism of action ==
tDCS stimulates and activates brain cells by delivering electrical signals. The lasting modulation of cortical excitability produced by tDCS makes it an effective solution to facilitate rehabilitation and treat a range of neuropsychiatric disorders. The way that the stimulation changes brain function is either by causing the neuron's resting membrane potential to depolarize or hyperpolarize. When positive stimulation (anodal tDCS) is delivered, the current causes a depolarization of the resting membrane potential, which increases neuronal excitability and allows for more spontaneous cell firing. Individual cells experience depolarization and hyperpolarization in different orientations in different fields. Depolarization increases firing, while hyperpolarization reduces excitability. These are called Acute effects. When negative stimulation (cathodal tDCS) is delivered, the current causes a hyperpolarization of the resting membrane potential. This decreases neuron excitability due to the decreased spontaneous cell firing. In addition to localized changes in cortical excitability, tDCS has been shown to influence large-scale brain networks. Rather than affecting isolated regions, stimulation may alter functional connectivity between distributed neural systems, which can contribute to variability in behavioral and cognitive outcomes.

In case of treating depression, tDCS currents specifically target the left side of the dorsolateral prefrontal cortex (DLPFC) located in the frontal lobe. Left DLPFC has been shown to be associated with lower activity in the depressed population.

tDCS is able to achieve cortical changes even after the stimulation is ended. The duration of this change depends on the length of stimulation as well as the intensity of stimulation. The effects of stimulation increase as the duration of stimulation increases or the strength of the current increases. tDCS has been proposed to promote both long term potentiation and long term depression.

== Operation ==
Transcranial direct current stimulation works by sending constant, low direct current through the electrodes. When these electrodes are placed in the region of interest, the current induces intracerebral current flow. This current flow then either increases or decreases the neuronal excitability in the specific area being stimulated based on which type of stimulation is being used. This change of neuronal excitability leads to alteration of brain function, which can be used in various therapies as well as to provide more information about the functioning of the human brain.

=== Parts ===
Transcranial direct current stimulation is a relatively simple technique requiring only a few parts. These include two electrodes and a battery-powered device that delivers constant current. Control software can also be used in experiments that require multiple sessions with differing stimulation types so that neither the person receiving the stimulation nor the experimenter knows which type is being administered. Each device has an anodal, positively charged electrode and a cathodal, negative electrode. Current is "conventionally" described as flowing from the positive anode, through the intervening conducting tissue, to the cathode, creating a circuit. Note that in traditional electric circuits constructed from metal wires, charge drift is created by the motion of negatively charged electrons, which actually flow from cathode to anode. However, in biological systems, such as the head, current is usually created by the flow of ions, which may be positively or negatively charged – positive ions will flow towards the cathode; negative ions will flow toward the anode. The device may control the current as well as the duration of stimulation.

=== Setup ===
To set up the tDCS device, the electrodes and the skin need to be prepared. This ensures a low resistance connection between the skin and the electrode. The careful placement of the electrodes is crucial to successful tDCS technique. The electrode pads come in various sizes with benefits to each size. A smaller sized electrode achieves a more focused stimulation of a site while a larger electrode ensures that the entirety of the region of interest is being stimulated. If the electrode is placed incorrectly, a different site or more sites than intended may be stimulated resulting in faulty results. One of the electrodes is placed over the region of interest and the other electrode, the reference electrode, is placed in another location in order to complete the circuit. This reference electrode is usually placed on the neck or shoulder of the opposite side of the body than the region of interest. Since the region of interest may be small, it is often useful to locate this region before placing the electrode by using a brain imaging technique such as fMRI or PET. Once the electrodes are placed correctly, the stimulation can be started. Many devices have a built-in capability that allows the current to be "ramped up" or increased gradually until the necessary current is reached. This decreases the amount of stimulation effects felt by the person receiving the tDCS. After the stimulation has been started, the current will continue for the amount of time set on the device and then will automatically be shut off. Recently a new approach has been introduced where instead of using two large pads, multiple (more than two) smaller sized gel electrodes are used to target specific cortical structures. This new approach is called High Definition tDCS (HD-tDCS). In a pilot study, HD-tDCS was found to have greater and longer lasting motor cortex excitability changes than sponge tDCS.

=== Types of stimulation ===
There are three different types of stimulation: anodal, cathodal, and sham. The anodal stimulation is positive (V+) stimulation that increases the neuronal excitability of the area being stimulated. Cathodal (V−) stimulation decreases the neuronal excitability of the area being stimulated. Cathodal stimulation can treat psychiatric disorders that are caused by the hyper-activity of an area of the brain. Sham stimulation is used as a control in experiments. Sham stimulation emits a brief current but then remains off for the remainder of the stimulation time. With sham stimulation, the person receiving the tDCS does not know that they are not receiving prolonged stimulation. By comparing the results in subjects exposed to sham stimulation with the results of subjects exposed to anodal or cathodal stimulation, researchers can see how much of an effect is caused by the current stimulation, rather than by the placebo effect.

=== At-home administration ===
Recently, tDCS devices are being researched and created intended for at-home use – ranging from treating medical conditions such as depression to enhancing general cognitive well-being. Clinical trials are needed to establish the efficacy, feasibility and acceptability of home-based tDCS treatment.

== History ==
The basic design of tDCS, using direct current (DC) to stimulate the area of interest, has existed for over 100 years. There were a number of rudimentary experiments completed before the 19th century using this technique that tested animal and human electricity. Luigi Galvani and Alessandro Volta were two such researchers that utilized the technology of tDCS in their explorations of the source of animal cell electricity [citation needed]. It was due to these initial studies that tDCS was first brought into the clinical scene. In 1801, Giovanni Aldini (Galvani's nephew) started a study in which he successfully used the technique of direct current stimulation to improve the mood of melancholy patients.

There was a brief rise of interest in transcranial direct current stimulation in the 1960s when studies by researcher D. J. Albert proved that the stimulation could affect brain function by changing the cortical excitability. He also discovered that positive and negative stimulation had different effects on the cortical excitability.

Research continued, further fueled by knowledge gained from other techniques like TMS and fMRI.

== Comparison to other devices ==
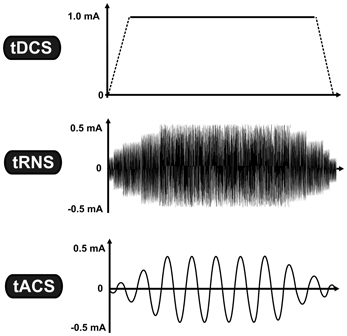
Transcranial electrical stimulation techniques. While tDCS uses constant current intensity, tRNS and tACS use oscillating current. The vertical axis represents the current intensity in milliamp (mA), while the horizontal axis illustrates the time-course.

In transcranial magnetic stimulation (TMS), an electric coil is held above the region of interest on the scalp that uses rapidly changing magnetic fields to induce small electrical currents in the brain. There are two types of TMS: repetitive TMS and single pulse TMS. Both are used in research therapy but effects lasting longer than the stimulation period are only observed in repetitive TMS. Similar to tDCS, an increase or decrease in neuronal activity can be achieved using this technique, but the method of how this is induced is very different. Transcranial direct current stimulation has the two different directions of current that cause the different effects. Increased neuronal activity is induced in repetitive TMS by using a higher frequency and decreased neuronal activity is induced by using a lower frequency.

Variants related to tDCS include tACS, tPCS and transcranial random noise stimulation (tRNS), a group of technologies commonly referred to as transcranial electrical stimulation, or TES.

== Research ==
=== Depression ===
Determining the safety and effectiveness of tDCS treatment for people with depression is being investigated:

- A systematic review of placebo-controlled trials investigating tDCS treatment for major depressive disorder was published 2020. The meta-analysis collated results across nine eligible studies (572 participants) up until December 2018 to estimate odds ratio (OR) and number needed to treat (NNT) of response and remission, and depression improvement. The results showed statistically superior efficacy of active tDCS compared to sham for nine eligible studies (572 participants), presenting moderate/high certainty of evidence, were included. Active tDCS was significantly superior to sham for response (30.9% vs. 18.9% respectively; OR = 1.96, 95%CI [1.30–2.95], NNT = 9), remission (19.9% vs. 11.7%, OR = 1.94 [1.19–3.16], NNT = 13) and depression improvement (effect size of β = 0.31, [0.15–0.47]).
- A 2016 meta-analysis showed that 34% of people treated with tDCS showed at least 50% symptom reduction (compared to 19% placebo).
- A 2017 study conducted by Brunoni showed 6-weeks of tDCS treatment resulted in reduction of at least half of depression symptoms in 41% of depressed people (vs. 22% placebo and 47% antidepressants).
- In 2015, the British National Institute for Health and Care Excellence (NICE) found tDCS to be safe and to appear effective for depression treatment. Up until 2014, there have been several small randomized clinical trials (RCT) in major depressive disorder (MDD); most found alleviation of depressive symptoms. There have been only two RCTs in treatment-resistant MDD; both were small, and one found an effect and the other did not. One meta-analysis of the data focused on reduction in symptoms and found an effect compared to sham treatment, but another that was focused on relapse found no effect compared to sham.

=== Other disorders ===
==== Cognition ====
There is mixed evidence about whether tDCS is useful for cognitive enhancement in healthy people. Several reviews have found evidence of small yet significant cognitive improvements. Other reviews found no evidence at all, although one of them has been criticized for overlooking within-subject effects and evidence from multiple-session tDCS trials. However, the original authors addressed these raised concerns in a further analysis and continued to find no evidence of impact

A 2015 review of results from hundreds of tDCS experiments found that there was no statistically conclusive evidence to support any net cognitive effect, positive or negative, of single session tDCS in healthy populations – there is no evidence that tDCS is useful for cognitive enhancement. A second study by the same authors found there was little-to-no statistically reliable impact of tDCS on any neurophysiologic outcome.

==== Parkinson's, Alzheimer's disease, and schizophrenia ====
There is no strong evidence that tDCS is useful for memory deficits in Alzheimer's disease, schizophrenia, non-neuropathic pain. A few clinical trials have been conducted on the use of tDCS to ameliorate memory deficits in Parkinson's disease and Alzheimer's disease and healthy subjects, with mixed results. Studies on tDCS for gait rehabilitation in Parkinson's patients have also shown mixed results. Research conducted as of 2013 in schizophrenia, has found that while large effect sizes were initially found for symptom improvement, later and larger studies have found smaller effect sizes (see also section on use of tDCS in psychiatric disorders below). Studies have mostly concentrated on positive symptoms like auditory hallucinations; research on negative symptoms is lacking.

==== Stroke ====
There is no strong evidence that tDCS can help improve upper limb function after stroke. In stroke, research conducted as of 2014, has found that tDCS is not effective for improving upper limb function after stroke. While some reviews have suggested an effect of tDCS for improving post-stroke aphasia, a 2015 Cochrane review could find no improvement from combining tDCS with conventional treatment. Research conducted as of 2013 suggests that tDCS may be effective for improve vision deficits following stroke.

Motor Learning and Memory Function

There is evidence that certain tDCS montages can increase learning rates for particular tasks in healthy individuals, namely motor tasks and memory function. However, reproducibility remains to be fully tested across studies and standardization for these kinds of studies has not been implemented fully, though an attempt at formalizing standards was released in 2017.

==== Other ====
Research conducted as of 2012 on the use of tDCS to treat pain, found that the research has been of low quality and cannot be used as a basis to recommend use of tDCS to treat pain. In chronic pain following spinal cord injury, research is of high quality and has found tDCS to be ineffective. tDCS has also been studied in addiction. There is some moderate (level B) evidence to indicate that, in addition to treating major depressive disorder, tDCS may also be appropriate to treat fibromyalgia, and craving disorders.

tDCS has been used in neuroscience research, particularly to try to link specific brain regions to specific cognitive tasks or psychological phenomena. The cerebellum has been a focus of research, due to its high concentration of neurons, its location immediately below the skull, and its multiple reciprocal anatomical connections to motor and associative parts of the brain. Most such studies focus on the impact of cerebellar tDCS on motor, cognitive, and affective functions in healthy and patient populations, but some also employ tDCS over the cerebellum to study the functional connectivity of the cerebellum to other areas of the brain.

== Limitations ==
While growing literature shows the efficacy of transcranial direct current stimulation (tDCS) for treating nervous diseases such as acute depressive episodes, the lack of knowledge about the nature of this treatment at the cell level raises concerns regarding possible adverse effects that would appear long after the treatment has ended.

First, tDCS therapy involves exposure of the brain to an intense electric field, which is several times and even orders of magnitude higher than natural ones in the brain. While the therapeutic effect is observed in a short period of months, the impact of the electric fields on the brain, specifically on the treated neuronal structures, is a question of further long-term research.

Second, tDCS brain tissue stimulation targets a large area of poorly characterized tissue. Therefore, it is unclear whether electrical fields reach only the neural structures of the brain that need treatment.

== Regulatory approvals ==
tDCS is a CE approved treatment for major depressive disorder (MDD) in the UK, EU, Australia, and Mexico. In December 2025, the company Flow Neuroscience announced that its tDCS device had been approved in the US for standalone or adjunctive treatment of depression at home.

== See also ==
- Cranial electrotherapy stimulation
- Neurotechnology
- Transcranial alternating current stimulation
- Transcranial random noise stimulation
- Transcranial magnetic stimulation
- Brainwave entrainment
- Non-invasive cerebellar stimulation
