= Vibroacoustic therapy =

Type of sound therapy

Vibroacoustic therapy (VAT) is a type of sound therapy that involves passing low frequency sine wave vibrations into the body via a device with embedded speakers. This therapy was developed in Norway by Olav Skille in the 1980s. The Food and Drug Administration determined that vibroacoustic devices, are "substantially equivalent" to other therapeutic vibrators, which are "intended for various uses, such as relaxing muscles and relieving minor aches and pains"; thus, vibroacoustic devices (therapeutic vibrators) are "exempt from clinical investigations, Good Guidance Practices (GGPs), and premarket notification and approval procedures."

== Frequencies ==
Vibroacoustic therapy uses low frequency sinusoidal vibrations between 0 and 500Hz depending on the product's frequency response and capabilities. This is similar to the range of subwoofers or vibrating theater seating. Human mechanoreceptors, such as Pacinian corpuscles, can detect vibrations up to 1,000 Hz, frequencies between 30 Hz and 120 Hz are generally considered to have a calming and relaxing effect, which is why they are often used in therapeutic contexts. 40 Hz specifically, has been widely studied in vibroacoustic therapy and other fields due to its potential benefits, such as promoting relaxation and improving focus. In addition to sinusoidal waves, vibroacoustic music is specifically composed for vibroacoustic therapy. These compositions incorporate low-frequency musical instruments and advanced audio engineering techniques to create an immersive and enjoyable therapeutic experience. The combination of carefully engineered music and vibroacoustic technology enhances the physical and emotional benefits of the therapy.

== Devices ==
Vibroacoustic devices come in a range of forms including beds, chairs, pillows, mats, wristbands, wearable backpacks, and simple DIY platforms. They generally function by playing sound files through transducers, bass shakers, or exciters which then transfer the vibrations into the body. Some devices attempt to target very specific parts of the body such as the wrist or the spine.

== Proposed mechanisms of action ==
Pallesthesia, the ability to perceive vibration, plays a crucial role in vibroacoustic therapy. This form of therapy relies on the body's sensitivity to mechanical vibrations. By stimulating vibratory perception through therapeutic sound waves, vibroacoustic therapy aims to promote physical and emotional well-being. Another proposed mechanisms of action for vibroacoustic therapy is brainwave entrainment. Entrainment suggests that brainwaves will synchronize with rhythms from sensory input. This further suggests that some brainwave frequencies are preferable to others in given situations.

== Current practice ==
Vibroacoustic therapy is available at a number of spas, resorts, and clinics around the world as well as a number of professional and holistic practitioners.

== Related therapies ==
Vibroacoustic Therapy is closely related to Physio Acoustic Therapy (PAT) which was developed by Petri Lehikoinen in Finland. Both are examples of low frequency sound stimulation (LFSS). More broadly, they are subsets of Rhythmic Sensory Stimulation (RSS) which is being studied across a range of sensory modalities.

== Criticism ==
The science behind vibroacoustic therapy has been questioned by multiple sources. Some sources refer to it as pseudoscience and the TedX talk by prominent vibroacoustic researcher Lee Bartel has been tagged as falling outside of the TED talk guidelines. Practitioners of VAT do agree that more research is needed as VAT has been a largely clinical practice since its inception. Academic research published in peer reviewed journals and meeting higher scientific standards is being pursued at the University of Toronto and other institutions to address these objections.
