= Exciter (audio transducer) =

An Exciter is an electroacoustic transducer. Exciters differ from the more common loudspeaker in that they have no cone and rely on being connected to a surface or object that can be used as a resonator via a mechanical connection. They have been used in several projects with novel resonators and are readily available from several suppliers.
