= Neurotechnology =

Technology that interfaces with the nervous system to monitor or modify neural function

Neurotechnology encompasses any method or electronic device which interfaces with the nervous system to monitor or modulate neural activity.

Common design goals for neurotechnologies include using neural activity readings to control external devices such as neuroprosthetics, altering neural activity via neuromodulation to repair or normalize function affected by neurological disorders, or augmenting cognitive abilities. In addition to their therapeutic or commercial uses, neurotechnologies also constitute powerful research tools to advance fundamental neuroscience knowledge.

Some examples of neurotechnologies include deep brain stimulation, photostimulation based on optogenetics and photopharmacology, transcranial magnetic stimulation, transcranial electric stimulation and brain–computer interfaces, such as cochlear implants and retinal implants.

The field of neurotechnology has been around for nearly half a century but has only reached maturity in the last twenty years. Decoding basic procedures and interactions within the brain's neuronal activity is essential to integrate machines with the nervous system. This is one of the central steps of the technological revolution based on a fusion of technologies that is blurring the lines between the physical, digital, and biological spheres. Integrating an electronic device with the nervous system enables monitoring and modulating neural activity as well as managing implemented machines by mental activity. Further work in this direction would have profound implications for improving existing and developing new treatments for neurological disorders and advanced "implantable neurotechnologies" as integrated artificial implants for various pieces of the nervous system. Advances in these efforts are associated with developing models based on knowledge about natural processes in bio-systems that monitor and/or modulate neural activity. One promising direction evolves through studying the mother-fetus neurocognitive model. According to this model, the innate natural mechanism ensures the embryonic nervous system's correct (balanced) development. Because the mother-fetus interaction enables the child's nervous system to evolve with adequate biological sentience, similar environmental conditions can treat the injured nervous system. This means that the physiological processes of this natural neurostimulation during gestation underlie any noninvasive artificial neuromodulation technique. This knowledge paves the way for designing and precise tuning noninvasive brain stimulation devices in treating different nervous system diseases within the scope of modulating neural activity.

More specialized sectors of the neurotechnology development for monitoring and modulating neural activity are aimed at creating powerful concepts as "neuron-like electrodes", "biohybrid electrodes", "planar complementary metal-oxide semiconductor systems", "injectable bioconjugate nanomaterials", "implantable optoelectronic microchips".

The advent of brain imaging revolutionized the field, allowing researchers to directly monitor the brain's activities during experiments. Practice in neurotechnology can be found in fields such as pharmaceutical practices, be it from drugs for depression, sleep, ADHD, or anti-neurotics to cancer scanning, stroke rehabilitation, etc.

Many in the field aim to control and harness more of what the brain does and how it influences lifestyles and personalities. Commonplace technologies already attempt to do this; games like BrainAge, and programs like Fast ForWord that aim to improve brain function, are neurotechnologies.

Currently, modern science can image nearly all aspects of the brain as well as control a degree of the function of the brain. It can help control depression, over-activation, sleep deprivation, and many other conditions. Therapeutically it can help improve stroke patients' motor coordination, improve brain function, reduce epileptic episodes (see epilepsy), improve patients with degenerative motor diseases (Parkinson's disease, Huntington's disease, ALS), and can even help alleviate phantom pain perception. Advances in the field promise many new enhancements and rehabilitation methods for patients with neurological problems. The neurotechnology revolution has given rise to the Decade of the Mind initiative, which was started in 2007. It also offers the possibility of revealing the mechanisms by which mind and consciousness emerge from the brain.

== Types ==
=== Neurostimulation ===
A wide range of neurostimulation techniques can be divided into four domains depending on the use of energy stimulation: acoustic wave energy, electrical energy, electromagnetic radiation, and magnetic energy. Some of these techniques are presented below:

==== Deep brain stimulation ====
Deep brain stimulation is currently used in patients with movement disorders to improve the quality of life in patients.

==== Transcranial ultrasound stimulation ====
Transcrancial ultrasound stimulation (TUS) is a technique using ultrasound to modulate neural activity in the brain. It is an emerging technique that has shown therapeutic promise in a variety of neurological diseases.

==== Transcranial magnetic stimulation ====
Transcranial magnetic stimulation (TMS) is a technique for applying magnetic fields to the brain to manipulate electrical activity at specific loci in the brain. This field of study is currently receiving a large amount of attention due to the potential benefits that could come out of better understanding this technology. Transcranial magnetic movement of particles in the brain shows promise for drug targeting and delivery as studies have demonstrated this to be noninvasive on brain physiology.

Transcranial magnetic stimulation is a relatively new method of studying how the brain functions and is used in many research labs focused on behavioral disorders, epilepsy, PTSD, migraine, hallucinations, and other disorders. Currently, repetitive transcranial magnetic stimulation is being researched to see if positive behavioral effects of TMS can be made more permanent. Some techniques combine TMS and another scanning method such as EEG to get additional information about brain activity such as cortical response.

==== Transcranial direct current stimulation ====
Transcranial direct current stimulation (TDCS) is a form of neurostimulation which uses constant, low current delivered via electrodes placed on the scalp. The mechanisms underlying TDCS effects are still incompletely understood, but recent advances in neurotechnology allowing for in vivo assessment of brain electric activity during TDCS promise to advance understanding of these mechanisms. Research into using TDCS on healthy adults have demonstrated that TDCS can increase cognitive performance on a variety of tasks, depending on the area of the brain being stimulated. TDCS has been used to enhance language and mathematical ability (though one form of TDCS was also found to inhibit math learning), attention span, problem solving, memory, coordination and relieve depression and chronic fatigue.

=== Electrophysiology ===
Electroencephalography (EEG) is a method of measuring brainwave activity non-invasively. A number of electrodes are placed around the head and scalp and electrical signals are measured. Clinically, EEGs are used to study epilepsy as well as stroke and tumor presence in the brain. Electrocorticography (ECoG) relies on similar principles but requires invasive implantation of electrodes on the brain's surface to measure local field potentials or action potentials more sensitively.

Magnetoencephalography (MEG) is another method of measuring activity in the brain by measuring the magnetic fields that arise from electrical currents in the brain. The benefit to using MEG instead of EEG is that these fields are highly localized and give rise to better understanding of how specific loci react to stimulation or if these regions over-activate (as in epileptic seizures).

There are potential uses for EEG and MEG such as charting rehabilitation and improvement after trauma as well as testing neural conductivity in specific regions of epileptics or patients with personality disorders. EEG has been fundamental in understanding the resting brain during sleep. Real-time EEG has been considered for use in lie detection. Similarly, real-time fMRI is being researched as a method for pain therapy by altering how people perceive pain if they are made aware of how their brain is functioning while in pain. By providing direct and understandable feedback, researchers can help patients with chronic pain decrease their symptoms.

=== Implants ===
Neurotechnological implants can be used to record and utilize brain activity to control other devices which provide feedback to the user or replace missing biological functions. The most common neurodevices available for clinical use are deep brain stimulators implanted in the subthalamic nucleus for patients with Parkinson's disease.

=== Pharmaceuticals ===
Pharmaceuticals play a vital role in maintaining stable brain chemistry, and are the most commonly used neurotechnology by the general public and medicine. Drugs like sertraline, methylphenidate, and zolpidem act as chemical modulators in the brain, and they allow for normal activity in many people whose brains cannot act normally under physiological conditions. While pharmaceuticals are usually not mentioned and have their own field, the role of pharmaceuticals is perhaps the most far-reaching and commonplace in modern society. Movement of magnetic particles to targeted brain regions for drug delivery is an emerging field of study and causes no detectable circuit damage.

== Ethical considerations ==
Like other disruptive innovations, neurotechnologies have the potential for profound social and legal repercussions, and as such their development and introduction to society raise a series of ethical questions.

Key concerns include the preservation of identity, agency, cognitive liberty and privacy as neurorights. While experts agree that these core features of the human experience stand to benefit from the ethical use of neurotechnology, they also make a point of emphasizing the importance of preventively establishing specific regulatory frameworks and other mechanisms that protect against inappropriate or unauthorized uses.

=== Identity ===
Identity in this context refers to personal continuity, described as bodily and mental integrity and their persistence over time. In other words, it is the individual's self-narrative and concept of self.

While disruption of identity is not a common goal for neurotechnologies, some techniques can create unwanted shifts that range in severity. For instance, deep brain stimulation is commonly used as treatment for Parkinson's disease but can have side effects that touch on the concept of identity, such as loss of voice modulation, increased impulsivity or feelings of self-estrangement. In the case of neural prostheses and brain-computer interfaces, the shift may take the form of an extension of one's sense of self, potentially incorporating the device as an integral part of oneself or expanding the range of sensory and cognitive channels available to the user beyond the traditional senses.

Part of the difficulty in determining which changes constitute a threat to identity is rooted in its dynamic nature: since one's personality and concept of self is expected to change with time as a result of emotional development and lived experience, it is not easy to identify clear criteria and draw a line between acceptable shifts and problematic changes. This becomes even harder when dealing with neurotechnologies aimed at influencing psychological processes—such as those designed to recude the symptoms of depression or post-traumatic stress disorder (PTSD) by modulating emotional states or saliency of memories to ease a patient's pain. Even helping a patient remember, which would seemingly help preserve identity, can be a delicate question: "Forgetting is also important to how a person navigates the world, since it allows the opportunity for both losing track of embarrassing or difficult memories, and focusing on future-oriented activity. Efforts to enhance identity through memory preservation thus run the risk of inadvertently damaging a valuable, if less consciously-driven cognitive process."

=== Agency ===
Although the nuances of its definition are debated in philosophy and sociology, agency is commonly understood as the individual's ability to consciously make and communicate a decision or choice. While identity and agency are distinct, an impairment in agency can in turn undermine personal identity: the subject may no longer be able to substantially modify their own self-narrative, and may therefore lose their ability to contribute to the dynamic process of identity formation.

The interplay between agency and neurotechnology can have implications for moral responsibility and legal liability. As with identity, devices aimed at treating some psychiatric conditions like depression or anorexia may work by modulating neural function linked with desire or motivation, potentially compromising the user's agency. This can also be the case, paradoxically, for those neurotechnologies designed to restore agency to patients, such as neural prostheses and BCI-mediated assistive technology like wheelchairs or computer accessibility tools. Because these devices often operate by interpreting sensory inputs or the user's neural data in order to estimate the individual's intention and respond according to it, estimation margins can lead to inaccurate or undesired responses that may threaten agency: "If the agent's intent and the device's output can come apart (think of how the auto-correct function in texting sometimes misinterprets the user's intent and sends problematic text messages), the user's sense of agency may be undermined."

=== Privacy ===
Finally, when these technologies are being developed society must understand that these neurotechnologies could reveal the one thing that people can always keep secret: what they are thinking. While there are large amounts of benefits associated with these technologies, it is necessary for scientists, citizens and policy makers alike to consider implications for privacy. This term is important in many ethical circles concerned with the state and goals of progress in the field of neurotechnology (see neuroethics). Current improvements such as "brain fingerprinting" or lie detection using EEG or fMRI could give rise to a set fixture of loci/emotional relationships in the brain, although these technologies are still years away from full application. It is important to consider how all these neurotechnologies might affect the future of society, and it is suggested that political, scientific, and civil debates are heard about the implementation of these newer technologies that potentially offer a new wealth of once-private information. Some ethicists are also concerned with the use of TMS and fear that the technique could be used to alter patients in ways that are undesired by the patient.

=== Cognitive liberty ===
Cognitive liberty refers to a suggested right to self-determination of individuals to control their own mental processes, cognition, and consciousness including by the use of various neurotechnologies and psychoactive substances. This perceived right is relevant for reformation and development of associated laws.

== See also ==
- Biotechnology
- Neural engineering
- Neuroimaging
- Neuromodulation
- Neuroscience
- Neurostimulation
- Neurotherapy
