= Lisanby =

Lisanby is a surname. Notable people with the surname include:

- Charles Lisanby (1924–2013), American production designer
- Gladys Kemp Lisanby (1928–2023), American patron of the arts and philanthropist
- James Lisanby (1928–2012), rear admiral in the United States Navy
- Sarah Lisanby (born c. 1965), American psychiatrist and academic
