= Jan-Otto Ottosson =

Swedish psychiatrist (1925–2023)

- Born: 11 October 1925; Kalmar, Sweden
- Died: 1 May 2023 (aged 97); Gothenburg, Sweden
- Title: Professor of Psychiatry

Jan-Otto Ottosson (October 11, 1925 – April 1, 2023) was a Swedish psychiatrist and professor who played an important role in the development of modern psychiatry in Sweden.

== Academic positions and research ==
He served as professor of psychiatry at Umeå University from 1963 to 1970 and later at University of Gothenburg from 1970 until his retirement in 1991. During his years in Gothenburg, he also served as a consultant at Sahlgrenska University Hospital.

Ottosson’s research and clinical work focused on several areas of psychiatry, including:

Electroconvulsive therapy (ECT)
Psychopharmacology
Psychotherapy
Psychosomatic medicine
Substance abuse
Suicide prevention

He was also active in medical ethics, serving as chairman of the ethics delegation of the Swedish Medical Society and as an expert for the Swedish National Council on Medical Ethics. Through these roles, he helped increase attention to ethical issues in healthcare and medical research.

In addition to his research and clinical work, Ottosson was a prominent author of psychiatric course literature and contributed significantly to the education of psychiatrists and other healthcare professionals in Sweden.

== Selected works ==
- 1983: Psykiatri (English: Psychiatry, eighth edition 2015)
- 1986: Akut psykiatri (English: Acute Psychiatry, fifth edition 2017)
- 1993: Vad gör jag med min ångest? (English: What Should I Do About My Anxiety?)
- 1999: Ethics in Electroconvulsive Therapy – co-written with Max Fink
- 2003: Psykiatrin i Sverige: vägval och vägvisare (English: Psychiatry in Sweden: Choices and Guiding Principles)
