= Electrical brain stimulation =

Form of electrotherapy

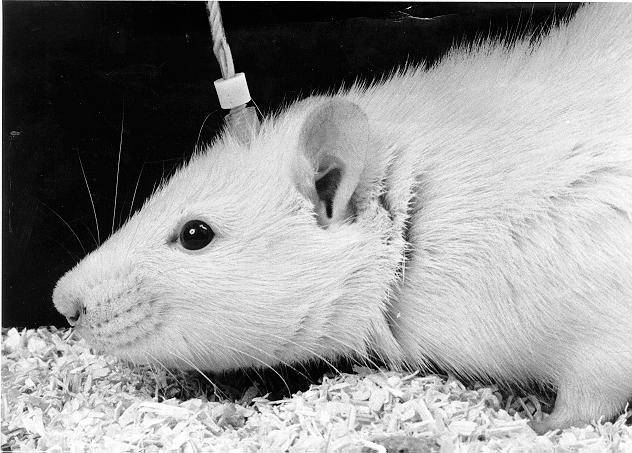
Chronic subcortical electrode implant in a laboratory rat used to deliver electrical stimulation to the brain.

Electrical brain stimulation (EBS), also referred to as focal brain stimulation (FBS), is a form of electrotherapy and neurotherapy used as a technique in research and clinical neurobiology to stimulate a neuron or neural network in the brain through the direct or indirect excitation of its cell membrane by using an electric current. EBS is used for research or for therapeutic purposes.

== History ==
Electrical brain stimulation was first used in the first half of the 19th century by pioneering researchers such as Luigi Rolando (1773–1831) and Pierre Flourens (1794–1867), to study the brain localization of function, following the discovery by Italian physician Luigi Galvani (1737–1798) that nerves and muscles were electrically excitable. The stimulation of the surface of the cerebral cortex by using brain stimulation was used to investigate the motor cortex in animals by researchers such as Eduard Hitzig (1838–1907), Gustav Fritsch (1838–1927), David Ferrier (1842–1928) and Friedrich Goltz (1834–1902). The human cortex was also stimulated electrically by neurosurgeons and neurologists such as Robert Bartholow (1831–1904) and Fedor Krause (1857–1937).

In the following century, the technique was improved by the invention of the stereotactic method by British neurosurgeon pioneer Victor Horsley (1857–1916), and by the development of chronic electrode implants by Swiss neurophysiologist Walter Rudolf Hess (1881–1973), José Delgado (1915–2011) and others, by using electrodes manufactured by straight insulated wire that could be inserted deep into the brain of freely-behaving animals, such as cats and monkeys. This approach was used by James Olds (1922–1976) and colleagues to discover brain stimulation reward and the pleasure center. American-Canadian neurosurgeon Wilder Penfield (1891–1976) and colleagues at the Montreal Neurological Institute used extensive electrical stimulation of the brain cortex in awake neurosurgical patients to investigate the motor and sensory homunculus (the representation of the body in the brain cortex according to the distribution of motor and sensory territories).

EBS remains inextricably entwined with the work of Robert Galbraith Heath, Delgado and Penfield. It's of interest that during cerebral localization studies, neurosurgeon Penfield could not elicit emotional reactions in humans, either by observing spontaneous epilepsy or by electrically stimulating the surface of the cerebral cortex. Neurophysiologist Delgado noted a few exceptions to this rule. In contrast, EBS, via deeply implanted electrodes in localized areas of the brain (deep brain stimulation; DBS), elicited both pleasurable and aversive responses in laboratory animals and humans as previously described.

EBS could elicit the ritualistic, motor responses of sham rage in cats by stimulation of the anterior hypothalamus, as well as more complex emotional and behavioral components of "true rage" in both experimental animals by stimulation of the lateral hypothalamus, and in human subjects by stimulating various deep areas of the brain. EBS in human patients with epilepsy could trigger seizures on the surface of the brain and pathologic aggression and rage with stimulation of the amygdala.

== Process ==
Two-photon excitation microscopy has shown that microstimulation activates neurons sparsely around the electrode even at low currents (as low as 10 μA) up to distances as far as four millimeters away. This happens without particularly selecting other neurons much nearer the electrode's tip. This is due to activation of neurons being determined by whether they do or do not have axons or dendrites that pass within a radius of 15 μm near the tip of the electrode. As the current is increased the volume around the tip that activates neuron axons and dendrites increases and with this the number of neurons activated. Activation is most likely to be due to direct depolarization rather than synaptic activation.

== Effects ==
A comprehensive review of EBS research compiled a list of many different acute impacts of stimulation depending on the brain region targeted. Following are some examples of the effects documented:

- Sensory: Feelings of body tingling, swaying, movement, suffocation, burning, shock, warmth, paresthesia, feeling of falling, oscillopsia, dysesthesia, levitation, sounds, phosphenes, hallucinations, micropsia, diplopia, etc.
- Motor: Eye movements, locomotion, speech arrest, automatisms, laughter, palilalia, chewing, urge to move, crying without feeling sad, etc.
- Autonomic: Blushing, mydriasis, change in blood pressure and breathing, apnea, nausea, tachycardia, sweating, etc.
- Emotional: Anxiety, mirth, feeling of unreality, fear, happiness, anger, sadness, transient acute depression, hypomania, etc.
- Cognitive: Acalculia, paraphasia, anomic aphasia, recalling memories, "going into a trance", "out of this world", conduction aphasia, hemispatial neglect, alexia, déjà vu, reliving past experiences, agraphia, apraxia, etc.

EBS in face-sensitive regions of the fusiform gyrus caused a patient to report that the faces of the people in the room with him had "metamorphosed" and became distorted: "Your nose got saggy, went to the left. [...] Only your face changed, everything else was the same."

== Therapeutic applications ==
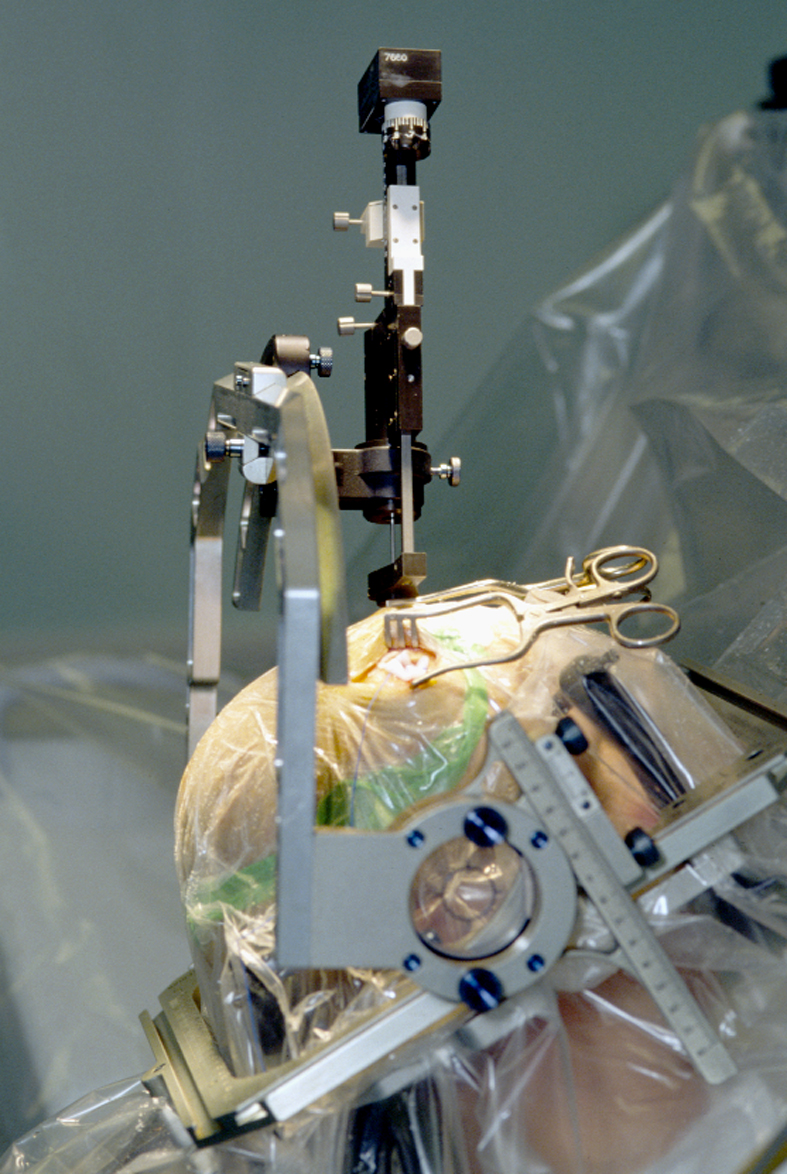
Stereotactic apparatus used to insert an electrode into the basal ganglia of the brain, for Parkinson's disease surgery.

Examples of therapeutic EBS are:

- Cranial electrotherapy stimulation (CES)
- Deep brain stimulation (DBS)
- Transcranial direct current stimulation (tDCS)
- Electroconvulsive therapy (ECT)
- Low field magnetic stimulation (LFMS)
- Functional electrical stimulation (FES)
- Magnetic seizure therapy (MST)
- Vagus nerve stimulation (VNS)
- Deep transcranial magnetic stimulation (Deep TMS)
- Responsive nerve stimulation (RNS)

Strong electric currents may cause a localized lesion in the nervous tissue, instead of a functional reversible stimulation. This property has been used for neurosurgical procedures in a variety of treatments, such as for Parkinson's disease, focal epilepsy and psychosurgery. Sometimes the same electrode is used to probe the brain for finding defective functions, before passing the lesioning current (electrocoagulation).
