= The Journal of ECT =

- Discipline: Psychiatry, electroconvulsive therapy
- Language: English
- Edited by: Randall Espinoza

Publication details
- Former name: Convulsive Therapy
- History: 1985–present
- Publisher: Lippincott Williams & Wilkins on behalf of the International Society for ECT and Neurostimulation
- Frequency: Quarterly
- Impact factor: 2.4

Standard abbreviations
- ISO 4: J. ECT
- NLM: J ECT

Indexing
- CODEN: JOUEFA
- ISSN: 1095-0680 (print); 1533-4112 (web)

Links
- Journal homepage

The Journal of ECT is an academic journal focused on electroconvulsive therapy (ECT) and related fields. (Note: These related fields include transcranial magnetic stimulation, vagus nerve stimulation, magnetic seizure therapy, and deep brain stimulation.) The journal was founded as Convulsive Therapy in 1985, and Max Fink was the founding editor. After Fink stepped down in 1994, Charles Kellner assumed the role. In 2004, Vaughn McCall became editor. The fourth editor-in-chief, Randall Espinoza, was named in 2023. The journal aims to be "a major force in reducing stigma" against ECT. It is published on behalf of the International Society for ECT and Neurostimulation.
