= Max Fink =

American neurologist and psychiatrist (1923–2025)

Maximilian Fink (January 16, 1923 – June 15, 2025) was an American neurologist and psychiatrist best known for his work on electroconvulsive therapy (ECT). In 1985, Fink founded the journal Convulsive Therapy, which is now called The Journal of ECT. His early work also included studies on the effect of psychoactive drugs on brain electrical activity; his later work included books about the syndromes of catatonia and melancholia, published in the 2010s.

== Background ==
Fink was born in Vienna, Austria, on January 16, 1923. His parents were a physician and a social worker. The family left Austria for the United States in 1924.

He married Martha Pearl Gross, Barnard College, class of 1949. They had three children, each an academic professor: Jonathan, geology, at Portland State University; Rachel at Mount Holyoke College, and Linda at Sweet Briar College. He had one brother who is a physician graduate of Columbia University.

His early education was in New York City, receiving the B.A. at University College, New York University (1942) and M.D. at NYU Bellevue Medical Center (1945). His medical training was under the United States Army auspices and he was appointed 1st Lieutenant Army Medical Corps on graduation, serving in active military service from April 1946 to November 1947. He attended the Army School of Military Neuropsychiatry in San Antonio in 1946.

Residency training in neurology and psychiatry from 1948 to 1954 was at New York's Montefiore, Bellevue, and Hillside Hospitals. He received training in electroencephalography at Mount Sinai Hospital under a fellowship of the National Foundation for Infantile Paralysis. Concurrently he attended the William Alanson White Institute of Psychoanalysis, receiving the Certificate for Physicians in 1953. He was board certified in neurology in 1952 and psychiatry in 1954.

Fink died in Westfield, Massachusetts, on June 15, 2025, at the age of 102.

== Academic positions, research and awards ==
Fink was appointed research professor of psychiatry at Washington University in 1962, at New York Medical College in 1966 and professor of psychiatry and neurology at State University of New York at Stony Brook in 1972.

Early research included federal government-funded research into the changes in brain waves (electroencephalogram) induced by electroshock, antidepressant and antipsychotic drugs, opiates and narcotic antagonists, and cannabis and metabolites. For the past fifty years, Fink's main interest was in electroconvulsive therapy. Over the years, his ideas on ECT evolved from an early suggestion that the biochemical basis of ECT is similar to that of craniocerebral trauma through to statements that organic mental syndrome is seen in all patients following ECT but is usually transient and finally to the position that ECT-induced memory loss is a hysterical symptom with parallels to the Camelford water pollution incident. A specific interest compared ECT to seizures induced by flurothyl.

A good part of his academic research was in the effects of psychoactive drugs on the electroencephalogram (see Pharmaco-electroencephalography).

His most recent interest was in the syndromes of catatonia and of melancholia.

In 1985, Fink founded the journal Convulsive Therapy (now called The Journal of ECT). He was a member of the American Psychiatric Association's task forces on ECT 1975–1978 and 1987–1990.

Fink's awards include the Electroshock Research Association Award (1956), the László Meduna Prize of the Hungarian National Institute for Nervous and Mental Disease (1986), and Lifetime Achievement Awards of the Psychiatric Times (1995) and of the Society of Biological Psychiatry (1996), Thomas William Salmon Award and Medal, New York Academy of Medicine (2011), and the C. Charles Burlingame Award and Lecture, Institute for Living, CT (2019).

== Retirement ==
In 1997, Fink moved to the Long Island Jewish Hillside Hospital to organize a government supported 4-hospital collaborative program examining continuation treatments in patients with major depression after successful ECT. The study group under the acronym "CORE"—Consortium on Research in ECT—has published on the merits of continuation ECT and continuation medication to sustain remission.

As professor emeritus of psychiatry and neurology at SUNY at Stony Brook and on the faculty at the Albert Einstein College of Medicine and the LIJ-Hillside Medical Center, he spent much of his retirement writing; later books include Electroshock: restoring the mind (1999, Oxford University Press); with Jan-Otto Ottosson, Ethics in electroconvulsive therapy (2004, Brunner Routledge); with Michael Alan Taylor, Catatonia: A Clinician's Guide to Diagnosis and Treatment (2003, Cambridge University Press), and Melancholia: The Diagnosis, Pathophysiology, and Treatment of Depressive Illness (2006, Cambridge University Press), with Edward Shorter, Endocrine Psychiatry: Solving the Riddle of Melancholia (2010, Oxford University Press) and The Madness of Fear: History of Catatonia (2018, Oxford University Press).

Fink funded a book on the history of ECT by Edward Shorter and David Healy.

== Archives ==
- SBU Library. Fink's archives from the 1950s to the present are at the Special Collections and University Archives of the Frank Melville Memorial Library of Stony Brook University, Stony Brook, New York.
