= Magnetic seizure therapy =

Proposed form of electrotherapy

Magnetic seizure therapy (MST) is a proposed form of electrotherapy and electrical brain stimulation. It is currently being investigated for the treatment of major depressive disorder, treatment-resistant depression (TRD), bipolar depression, schizophrenia and obsessive–compulsive disorder. MST is stated to work by inducing seizures via magnetic fields, in contrast to electroconvulsive therapy (ECT) which does so using alternating electric currents. Additionally, MST works in a more concentrated fashion than ECT, thus able to create a seizure with less of a total electric charge. In contrast to (r)TMS, the stimulation rates are higher (e.g. 100 Hz at 2 T) resulting in more energy transfer. Currently it is thought that MST works in patients with major depressive disorder by activating the connection between the subgenual anterior cingulate cortex and the parietal cortex.

== Medical uses ==
Magnetic seizure therapy is a new treatment modality that is being studied for the treatment of multiple psychiatric conditions, including major depressive disorder, treatment-resistant depression (TRD), bipolar depression, schizophrenia and obsessive–compulsive disorder.

=== Depression ===
MST is currently being studied to as a potential treatment option versus ECT based on the need for a procedure with a different safety and side effect profile. Current limitations to a more widespread implementation of MST for these diseases are the variable dosages, number of treatments, and efficacy versus other treatment modalities. A Cochrane review (2021) with three studies (65 participants) found insufficient evidence of a difference between MST and ECT.

== Procedure ==
MST is performed with the use of a modified rTMS device that delivers a higher output. Similar to ECT, because MST induces seizures, general anesthesia is used to relax the muscles. However, because there is not an electric current that may stimulate the jaw muscles, a bite block is not necessary. Coils are placed over the frontal cortex (usually bilaterally) and the treatment dosage is usually determined via titration with a preset dosing schedule. The treatment dosage is determined once the seizure threshold has been met and a sufficient seizure is produced. Various coil designs have been tested, such as the figure 8 coil, double cone coil, and cap coil. The latter two are the ones that have been most reliable in seizure induction.

== Mechanism of action ==
The mechanism of action of MST is not yet clearly understood. One hypothesis focuses on the neuroplasticity of the affected areas of the brain, mostly including the hippocampus and amygdala. Further recent imaging with fMRI has shown an effect on the connection between the subgenual anterior cingulate cortex and the parietal cortex.

== Adverse effects ==
Adverse effects include disorientation, emergence of mania, and superficial burns due to coil malfunctions. While one study did note a decline in autobiographical memory after MST, many studies have noted no anterograde memory loss nor retrograde memory loss, both of which are more commonly seen side effects of ECT. Other adverse effects include generalized seizures as well as side effects typically seen with general anesthesia. Hearing loss is a possible adverse effect from the clicking noise of the magnetic coils if earplugs are not used.

== See also ==
- Harold A. Sackeim
- Sarah Lisanby
