= Gladys Kemp Lisanby =

Gladys Elnora Kemp Lisanby (December 14, 1928 – July 8, 2023) was the president of the National Museum of Women in the Arts.

== Personal life ==
Lisanby graduated James Madison University in 1949. Lisanby met Rear Admiral James Lisanby of the United States Navy in Norfolk, Virginia while he was serving on his first ship, the USS Mississippi and she was a teacher at Woodrow Wilson High School in Portsmouth, Virginia. She and James were married shortly thereafter until his death 61 years later. She and James had two daughters, Elizabeth Ann Lisanby and Dr. Sarah Lisanby.

== Awards ==
She was recognized by the National Museum of Women in the Arts in 2004 with the National Advisory Board Award for Outstanding Service to the Arts.

In 2005 she was awarded the Mississippi Governor's Award for Excellence in the Arts in recognition of her work with the organization.

== Legacy ==
The James and Gladys Kemp Lisanby Museum at James Madison University is named in honor of Admiral Lisanby and Gladys Kemp Lisanby.
