= James Lisanby =

American naval officer (1928–2012)

James W. Lisanby (1928 – 2012) was a Rear Admiral in the United States Navy.

== Background ==
Born in Caldwell County, Kentucky, Lisanby graduated the United States Naval Academy and earned graduate degrees from both the Massachusetts Institute of Technology and Harvard Business School.

== Career ==
His final post was Deputy Commander for Acquisition and Logistics in the Naval Sea Systems Command.

== Family ==
Lisanby was married for 61 years to Gladys Kemp Lisanby and had two daughters, Elizabeth Ann Lisanby and Dr. Sarah Lisanby.

His brother was designer Charles Alvin Lisanby who had a seven decade career in the arts and entertainment industry, marked by 16 Emmy Award nominations and three wins.

== Legacy ==
The James and Gladys Kemp Lisanby Museum at James Madison University is named in honor of Admiral Lisanby and his wife.
