= Harold A. Sackeim =

Harold A. Sackeim is an American psychologist and electroconvulsive therapy researcher. He has been Chief of the Department of Biological Psychiatry at New York State Psychiatric Institute and Professor of Clinical Psychology in Psychiatry and Radiology at Columbia University. He received his bachelor's degree from Columbia in 1972; in 1974, he received his master's degree from Oxford University; and in 1977 he received his Ph.D. from the University of Pennsylvania.

Sackeim is co-author of more than 300 publications relating to electroconvulsive therapy. Sackheim has consulted for MECTA and Somatics, companies that manufacture devices for its administration, with payments going to his lab instead of to himself personally.

In 2007, Sackeim and his colleagues published the results of a study which followed 250 patients who had received electroconvulsive therapy. The study found that the various techniques used when giving electroconvulsive therapy can have a direct impact on the adverse effects experienced by patients. Sackeim and colleagues later demonstrated that right unilateral electroconvulsive therapy with an ultra brief pulse appears to be the most efficacious, while remaining the least likely to cause adverse effects.
