= Charles Lisanby =

American production designer

- Born: Charles Alvin Lisanby Jr. January 22, 1924; Princeton, Kentucky, U.S.
- Died: August 23, 2013 (aged 89); Los Angeles, California, U.S.
- Occupations: Production Designer and Set Designer
- Years active: 1948–1998
- Partner: Richard Bostard

Charles Alvin Lisanby Jr. (January 22, 1924 – August 23, 2013) was an American production designer who had a formative role for scenic design in early color television. During his career, Lisanby was nominated for sixteen Emmys and won three. In January 2010, he was inducted into the Academy of Television Arts and Sciences Hall of Fame at the nineteenth annual ceremony alongside Don Pardo, the Smothers Brothers, Bob Stewart, and Gene Roddenberry. Aside from his success in the entertainment industry, Lisanby was known for his friendship with the artist Andy Warhol.

== Background ==
Lisanby was born on January 22, 1924, in Princeton, Kentucky to parents Rebecca Hollingsworth Lisanby and Charles Alvin Lisanby Sr.

Lisbany was interested in set design from an early age. Starting at the age of ten, Lisbany carefully constructed a model to scale of the Radio City Music Hall with nothing but an article he had read that included the plans of the stage. After graduating high school in 1940 at the age of 16, Lisanby moved to New York to pursue art studied and an apprenticeship under the famed Broadway & Film Art Director, Cecil Beaton. Soon thereafter, he was drafted into the United States Army to serve in World War II. Receiving an early discharge due to meningitis, Charles ignored his father's wishes for him to become a doctor and returned to New York to attend art school.

His brother was retired United States Navy Rear Admiral James Lisanby (1928–2012), a former Chief of Engineers.

== Influences in early color television ==
Charles Lisanby is currently the first and only Production Designer ever inducted into the Academy of Television Arts and Sciences Hall of Fame. As well as contributing spectacular scenes and set piece design for countless television shows and movies, Lisanby helped pioneer several key recognizable features of television. As color television developed, experimentation with colorful scenes and costumes was needed and developed. In 1957 he designed the first telecast in color for CBS, an episode for a show called "The Big Record". One key feature Lisanby directly mastered was the use of neon lighting for shows. Early experiments with neon lights created a buzzing sound through the microphone system which was severe enough it could not be used. After working with engineers, lighting, and sound experts Lisanby was able to incorporate neon lights for the first time in television history - a skill for which his expertise was sought out. Lisanby also invented lighted steps as a feature of shows and was the first to implement large block letters which actors could sit on as a part of the set.

As well as influencing scenic design as it is known today, Charles designed the first ever mini-series on television in 1973–1974 with his Emmy-winning Ben Franklin series. He took scenic design to new heights with monumental set pieces such as his Parisian street set which created buzz across Hollywood and within the profession. Throughout his nearly 50-year career, Lisanby became arguably the most influential scenic designer as he pioneered early color television.

== Career ==
Lisanby's first solo professional commission was given to him in 1947 when the Friars Club in New York City commissioned him to paint a mural in the dining room of their headquarters. Coincidentally Ralph Levy, who at the time worked for CBS, saw his work and asked him to design the experimental made-for-television ballet "Billy the Kid". His work gained the attention of the Theatrical Stage Designers Union who demanded he cease working for CBS until he took a test to gain entrance into the Union. Lisanby passed the test with the highest marks and met the influential stage designer Oliver Messel who offered him a job as his assistant working on the Broadway show Romeo and Juliet starring Olivia de Havilland in 1951.

After Romeo and Juliet, Lisanby continued to work in the same scene shop for a year until he was offered a job by Jim McNaughton at ABC. In 1954, CBS offered him a job for twice the salary which he immediately took and worked on The Jane Froman Show. He then worked for CBS for a number of years on such shows as the infamous $64,000 Question and Camera Three where he met Lewis Freedman, the future head of PBS and director of the National Endowment for the Arts.

In 1958, Lisanby was asked to work with Ralph Levy and Bob Banner on The Gary Moore Show where he worked for six years on 234 shows and helped give Carol Burnett her television debut. After the series ended he went on to work on the Kraft Music Hall for Smith/Hemion; and in 1973 and 1974 he designed the Ben Franklin miniseries and received his first Emmy. Starting in 1979 he began annually working on Radio City Music Hall's Christmas Spectacular which he continued designing until 1996.

Working on everything from made-for-television movies, musicals, ballets and Broadway shows, Lisanby influenced nearly every aspect of scenic design in all mediums which he worked.

== Relationship with Andy Warhol ==
Lisanby met Andy Warhol at a party thrown by Bill Cecil in the mid-1950s in New York. At the party, Warhol was sitting alone in the corner not socializing with anyone, so he approached him to help him meet people. The two began conversing and ended up leaving the party at the same time. That particular night it was raining, so he and Warhol stood under the awning of a taxidermy shop where Lisanby pointed out that he liked a stuffed peacock in the window. The next day, the peacock was delivered to Lisanby's door and their relationship blossomed from there.

The two became nearly inseparable and began talking on the phone daily. They met every Sunday to do figure drawings and studies which influence both artists greatly as they matured in their respective careers. Warhol created an entire gallery exhibit (DETAILS) of the drawings he had done of Lisanby. Although his work had him traveling between the east and west coasts, he and Warhol kept in contact with regular phone calls.

In 1956, Lisanby and Warhol took a four-month-long trip around the world which greatly influenced both of their work and directly inspired Warhol's Golden Shoes. He came up with the title to Warhol's book 25 Cats Name Sam and One Blue Pussy, a book that granted the two their first copyrighted work, and both artists frequently exchanged art and ideas into the early 1960s.

As Warhol gained more fame for his pop art, the two began to separate in their friendship. Warhol asked Lisanby to join him in the pop art movement and become a famous pop artist as well, but Lisanby did not wish to be a part of it. He was in favor of much more realistic art and he decided that Warhol's Factory was not his scene. Warhol even tried to give Lisanby one of his most famous Marilyn Monroe prints that he made specifically for him. He refused the print even though Warhol famously said, "Wrap it up in brown paper. Put it in the back of a closet. One day it'll be worth a million dollars."

Warhol was infatuated with Lisanby and wanted to a have a romantic relationship with him but it was unrequited love, causing Warhol's heart to be broken. However, the two remained "best friends for many, many years," according to Lisanby. Reportedly, he rejected Warhol's sexual advances but Lisanby said, "I don't think [Warhol] wanted to have sex." "He said he thought sex was 'messy.' That was his word, it was too 'messy and distasteful.' He told me he'd had sex a few times, he had tried it and didn't really like it," Lisanby said.

== The Charles Lisanby Collection ==
Lisanby donated his life's work to James Madison University in 2010. Two years later the new James and Gladys Kemp Lisanby Museum in Festival Conference and Student Center held an exhibit to highlight Lisanby's most important contributions to the arts of television and scenic design, as well as introduce his relationship with Andy Warhol. Mentor to an Icon: A Charles Lisanby and Andy Warhol Exhibit was on view from January 23, 2012 – March 2, 2012. The exhibit was drawn from the Madison Art Collection, part of JMU's College of Visual and Performing Arts and was curated by two James Madison University graduating Visual and Performing Arts students, Josh Smead and John Kimbriel. They spoke about the collection at their "First Friday Talk" on February 3, 2013. The exhibit was accompanied by a free iPad app called "Mentor to an Icon" that allowed visitors to interact with and learn more about the individual works exhibited as well as view interviews with and videos of and about Lisanby.

== Death ==
Lisanby died on August 23, 2013, at his Los Angeles, California home of complication following a fall at the age of 89. He was outlived by his lifelong partner Richard Bostard, his nieces, Dr. Sarah Hollingworth Lisanby, Mrs. Elizabeth Ann Lisbany Bianchi, and his sister-in-law, Mrs. Gladys Elnora Kemp Lisbany.

== Career timeline ==
Year	Show	Notes
1948	Billy the Kid (Ballet)	First ballet on television, broadcast in New York City
1951	Romeo and Juliet	Broadway show, starring Olivia de Havilland; Assisted Oliver Messel
1951–1952	Can-Can	Painted scenery
1952	America's Town Meeting	Television show anchored by John Daly
1952	Paul Whiteman's Goodyear Revue	
1953	The Jane Froman Show	Met and worked with Irving Mansfield and Byron Paul
1955	$64,000 Question	Created and designed the contestant's isolation booths
1956	Camera Three	Produced by Robert Herridge and directed by Lewis Freedman
1957	Hotel Paradiso	Broadway musical
1957	Little Glass Clock and My Fair Lady	Broadway musicals; Assisted Cecil Beaton, lighting credit
1958	Dotto	Designed the set but had no part in the scandal
1958–1964	The Garry Moore Show	Worked on 234 shows over six years with Ralph Levy and Bob Banner
1962	Julie and Carol at Carnegie Hall	Show featuring Julie Andrews and Carol Burnett, a lifelong friend of Charles
1963	Calamity Jane	Featured Carol Burnett
1964	Once Upon a Mattress	
1966–1967	Animal Keepers	
1972	Applause	Musical starring Lauren Bacall
1972	Trouble with People	Written by Neil Simon
1973–1974	Benjamin Franklin (TV Miniseries)	Won an Emmy
1976–1977	Paul Lynde Specials	Halloween and Christmas Specials
1977	The Court Marshal of George Armstrong Custer	
1978	20th Grammy Awards	Designed the awards show
1979	Alan King Specials	Total of 12 shows
1979–1996	Radio City Music Hall's Annual Christmas Spectacular	
1979	You Can't Take it With You	
1980	Baryshnikov on Broadway	Won an Emmy
1980	Bob Hope's Wine, Women and Song	
1980	Folies Bergere (Tropicana, Las Vegas)	Currently playing open ended
1980	The Glory of Christmas	Performed at Crystal Cathedral through 2006
1981	Diana	Diana Ross special
1981	Report to Murphy	starring Michael Keaton, pilot and series
1982	Working	PBS' American Playhouse
1982	Night of 100 Stars	Alexander Kohen/ABC
1982	Weekend	PBS' American Playhouse
1982	ENCORE	Radio City's 50th Anniversary Show
1982	Peter Allen at the Pantages, LA	
1982	Glory of Easter	Crystal Cathedral through 2002
1983	Walt Disney's Radio City Summer Show	
1983	Dr. Pepper commercials (7)	
1983	Merrill Lynch (the original "bull") commercials (3)	
1984	French Revue for the Bahamas Princess	Through 1995
1984	Pilot for Cindy – (Williams)	NBC
1984	Multiple Irish Spring commercials	
1985	STARZ	Conrad International Hotel, Australia. Currently running open-ended
1985	Radio City HBO Christmas Special	
1985	MTV Awards (2)	
1986	Family Tree	Would go on to be the inspiration for Children of Eden
1987	Panasonic VCR (hands) commercials	
1987	Salute to American Imagination – Ford 75th Anniversary Show	
1987	Barry Manilow Special	CBS/Steve Binder; Won an Emmy
1988	David Letterman's 5th Anniversary Special	NBC
1988	60th Anniversary Academy Awards Show	
1989	Miss America Pageant	1 of 4
1989	Hot Prospects	TV half-hour pilot – starring George Clooney
1990	Super Bowl Halftime Show	
1990	I'm Home	Pilot MGM/UA
1990	Class of the 20th Century	12 specials – A&E hosted by Richard Dreyfuss
1990	65th Grand Ole Opry Special	
1992/1993	Tropworld, Atlantic City Extravaganza, 60th Anniversary Radio City Touring Show	77 weeks and remounted at Las Vegas Flamingo Hilton in 1995
1994	Disney Greatest Hits on Ice	CBS
1996	Disney's "Hunchback of Notre Dame"	At the Superdome in New Orleans – live and TV
1998	Reflections on Ice	Starring Michelle Kwan, based upon Mulan – ABC/Disney
