= Sarah Lisanby =

American medical researcher

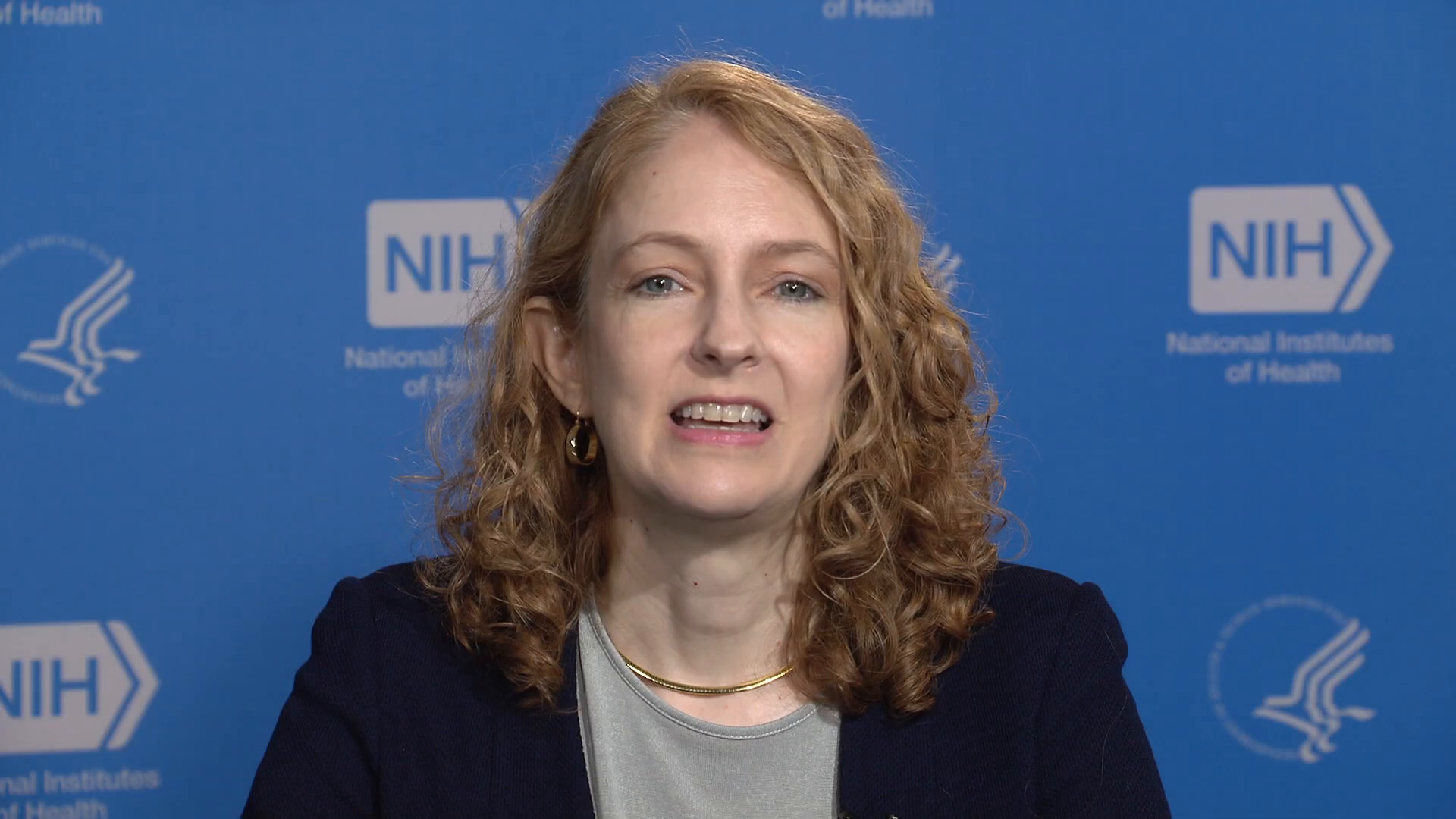
Sarah H. Lisanby introducing an NIH training video

Sarah H. Lisanby (born c.1965) is an American psychiatrist who studies the use of neurostimulation devices to treat mental illness. Since 2015 she has directed the division of the National Institute of Mental Health (NIMH) working on translational research.

== Career ==
Lisanby received dual undergraduate degrees in mathematics and psychology from Duke University in 1987 and received her MD there as well. She completed a residency in psychiatry, serving as chief resident. While she was a resident, she witnessed a woman with catatonic major depressive disorder undergo a dramatic remission after being treated with electroconvulsive therapy (ECT) and this set the course for the rest of her career.

After she graduated she undertook a fellowship at the New York Psychiatric Institute under Harold A. Sackeim, who had been doing research on ways to reduce the adverse effects of ECT on memory by using magnets to induce seizures in the brain instead of delivering electricity directly, a therapeutic mode called magnetic seizure therapy (MST). He asked her to work on developing a prototype that could do this, and by 2000 she and a team of collaborators had prepared one, and it was tested on a person in Switzerland. She also started investigating transcranial magnetic stimulation with Sackheim at the institute.

In 2005 she founded the Division of Brain Stimulation at Columbia University.

When Kitty Dukakis published her book about ECT in 2006 and in her subsequent advocacy for ECT, Lisanby has been asked to provide medical commentary on ECT.

By 2010 Lisanby had led two scientific societies focused on neurostimulation and had published 150 papers; at that time she moved back to Duke. In 2013 she was involved in some of the early clinical studies of transcranial direct current stimulation.

In 2015 she was recruited to NIMH by Thomas Insel.

In much of her career she has advocated in public, in the scientific community, in the medical community, and at the FDA to remove the stigma from ECT and to develop MST and other neurostimulation methods.

Lisanby was interviewed in 2018 by Anderson Cooper for the CBS television show 60 Minutes as an expert on MST.
